= Fast loader =

Software acceleration program for file loading

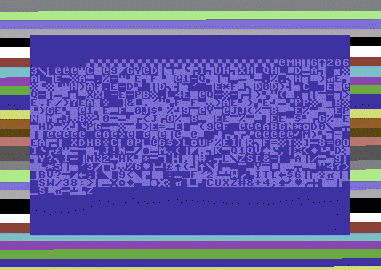
A program being loaded from disk using a fast loader

A fast loader is a software program for a home computer, such as the Commodore 64 or ZX Spectrum, that accelerates the speed of file loading from floppy disk or compact cassette.

== Floppy disks ==
Fast loaders came about because of a discrepancy between the actual speed at which floppy drives could transfer data and the speed that was provided by the operating system's default routines. This discrepancy was most pronounced on the VIC-20 and Commodore 64. While the earlier Commodore PET series had used an industry-standard IEEE-488 parallel bus, this was replaced with a custom Commodore serial bus on the VIC-20. The serial bus was intended to be nearly as fast as its predecessor, due to the use of the 6522 VIA as a hardware shift register on both the drive and computer. However, hardware bugs were discovered in the 6522 that prevented this function from working consistently. As a result, the KERNAL ROM routines were hastily rewritten to transfer a single bit at a time, using a slow software handshaking protocol.

Although the C64 replaced the 6522 VIA with two 6526 CIA chips, which did not suffer from this bug, the companion 1541 disk drive still had a 6522 VIA. Commodore chose not to redesign the 1541 hardware, also in order to retain backward compatibility with VIC-20 peripherals; this however came at the expense of speed. Because of the transfer protocol, the Commodore 1540 and 1541 disk drives soon gained a reputation for extreme slowness. Only at the introduction of the Commodore 128 computer and the Commodore 1571 disk drive was the original plan put into action and a hardware shift register was used, reducing the need for special fast loaders.

Soon after the C64's release, some astute programmers realized that Commodore's bit-banging serial KERNAL routines were unnecessarily sluggish. Since the CPU in the C64 ran at approximately the same speed as that in the 1541 disk drive, it was sufficient to synchronize only at the beginning of each byte, rather than at each individual bit. Moreover, this transfer method allowed two bits to be sent simultaneously, one over the standard DATA line and one over the CLK line (which was normally used to perform the handshaking). On the C64, this required very careful timing to avoid interference from interrupts and from the VIC-II graphics chip, which could "steal" CPU cycles. Some fast loaders disabled interrupts and blanked the screen for this reason. A fast loader would generally "wedge" itself into the LOAD vector at $0330, thus intercepting any calls to the KERNAL LOAD routine. Next, the fast loader would transfer the necessary code into the drive RAM and order its execution, then receive the file sent by the altered transfer code. Depending on the exact nature of the routines used, the loading speed could be improved by as much as a factor of five.

This technique was used for a few of the many fast-load systems made (such as JiffyDOS). Others were simply more efficient in I/O and file handling, offering marginal to good improvement. Other products added parallel hardware.

=== Commercial ===
Various software companies released fast loaders for the C64, usually in cartridge form. In the United States, probably the most popular such cartridge was the Epyx FastLoad. Most fast loader cartridges also incorporated other features to increase ease of use. An on-board implementation of Commodore's DOS Wedge was included in most fast loader cartridges. Machine language monitors, disk editors, and various convenience commands for Commodore BASIC were also common additions. Some fast loader cartridges were very sophisticated, incorporating a reset button, "freeze" capabilities, and a simple onboard GUI. The Final Cartridge III was perhaps the most successful of this genre. A few commercial fast loaders, most notably CMD's JiffyDOS, were not cartridge-driven but instead replaced the KERNAL ROM in the C64 and the DOS ROM in the 1541. While these were more difficult to install, they offered greatly increased compatibility, being almost invisible to software running on the machine. The cartridge, Action Replay MK6 RAM loader loads a 202 block program in around 9 seconds. Its Warp loader is 25 times faster, but programs can only be loaded with a loader saved to disk when the cartridge is not present. Whereas the ARMK6 fastloader was compatible with most software, The Final Cartridge III was known to crash often, so programs had to be loaded in normal C64 mode, deactivating the cartridge, making it more or less useless.

Many commercial programs for the C64, especially games, contained their own fast-loading routines on the distribution media. The user would load a small "stub" program from the disk with the standard slow routines, which would then install faster transfer routines in both the computer and the drive before proceeding to load the rest of the program at high speed. This way, the user benefited from the fast loader without having to buy or know about a dedicated fast-loader product.

=== Type-in ===
Several popular Commodore magazines published type-in fast loading software. In April 1985, Compute! published TurboDisk, a fast loader that included C64 and VIC-20 versions. This program proved popular and was republished in the July 1985 issue of Compute!'s Gazette.

It was printed yet again in August 1986, without the VIC-20 version, but with several accompanying utilities to relocate the program in memory and to create auto-booting software that took advantage of TurboDisk's speed. A Commodore 128 version was also included for those C128 users who still had 1541 disk drives.

COMPUTE!'s Gazette also published several other utilities that speed up C64-to-1541 communications, including Turbo Copy (a 4-minute full-disk copier), TurboSave (a utility that accelerated the speed of disk saves) and Quick! (another fast loader).

RUN Magazine published Sizzle! in December 1987, an integrated package that included a relocatable fast loader with autoboot generation capability.

BYTE published Loader, a machine-language fast-loading software for Apple DOS 3.3, in November 1983. Compute! published TurboDisk for DOS 3.3 in October 1986.

The type-in fast loader fashion continued in the age of the Internet. Krill's Loader (2009) and Spindle (2013) are two examples of C64-to-1541 "IRQ loaders", fast loaders that allow programs (mainly games) to keep their own IRQs during loading. With modern loaders the slow rate of GCR decoding proved to be the bottleneck, and modern loaders all carry their own optimized routines for such.

== Cassette tapes ==
The built-in routines for storing and reading data to and from Compact Cassette tapes were made for safe storing rather than speed. Better tape quality in the 1980s made it possible to store data more densely, reducing loading time and tape length. A special, separate program is thus needed to read and write the new denser formats.

Such programs existed for several computers, such as the Ohio Scientific Challenger. The PET Rabbit was one such program for the PET, while TurboTape was one for the Commodore Datassette. Turbo 2000 was a similar system for the Atari.

=== SpeedLock ===
Speedlock was a software protection system used on the ZX Spectrum and the Amstrad CPC, written by David Aubrey-Jones and David Looker in 1983. The prototype sat unused for about a year, but was finally picked up by Ocean Software on Daley Thompson's Decathlon, released in late 1984. It was subsequently used by U.S. Gold and for several titles by Ultimate Play the Game, amongst others. Speedlock was also ported to the Amstrad CPC in 1985. The system used several advanced features of the Spectrum's architecture, such as the memory refresh register and parity branch instructions of the Z80 processor, which made it harder to create illegitimate copies without the protection. Early versions used a set of audible "clicking" lead tones when loading a program. Later versions did not include this, but instead had a counter showing the time left to finish loading the program, similar to those of Technician Ted and Fairlight.

Some companies created software to bypass protection schemes, including Speedlock, for the purpose of backing up or transferring to ZX Microdrive, the ZX Spectrum +3, or other proprietary disk systems.

=== Commodore programs ===
As mentioned above, TurboTape is designed for the Commodore Datassette hardware. It approximately doubles the bit-density. Tapes using these format are prefaced with a loader program in the standard format, a common practice in these accelerated tapes.

Invade-a-Load title screen

Invade-a-Load was a fast loader for cassette-based games which not only accelerated the loading of blocks from the tape, but also contained a mini-game (in this case, a clone of Space Invaders) that could be played while waiting for the main game to finish loading. This initial minigame was loaded in under a minute, providing entertainment while waiting for the actual game to load, which could take a further five to ten minutes. On at least one occasion, a reviewer expressed their preference for Invade-a-Load over the main game itself. It mostly appeared in games sold in the United Kingdom, as, by the time it was written, the Commodore market in the United States had mostly switched to floppy disk media. The loader was written by Richard Aplin for Mastertronic's own use. The loader itself has a copyright date of 1987, but the first games that used the loader showed up in 1988. Over the following years, Mastertronic used the loader in dozens of titles. The loader was also memorable for the soundtrack, originally made by Rob Hubbard for the Mastertronic title One Man and His Droid.

In the UK, where the price of a 1541 disk drive was beyond the means of many of the target audience of C64 owners, there was enormous demand for fast loaders for C64 games. One of the first to use such a loader was Llamasoft where Jeff Minter's classic Revenge of the Mutant Camels came with a fast loading version on one side of the cassette and a conventional loading version on the other. Soon enough other software houses jumped on board. Ocean used "pavloda" and a real breakthrough came with the Novaload software which allowed loading screens and music to play. Daley Thompson's Decathlon was a very visible example of this. U.S. Gold releases became infamous for playing the U.S. National Anthem and showing a character map version of the Stars and Stripes as their games loaded. Other notable releases included Ocean/Imagine's port of Konami's Hyper Sports which had animated sprites of runners as the game loaded and two impressive soundtracks by Martin Galway, including a version of Vangelis' "Chariots of Fire".

== Optical discs ==
In 1995, Yoichi Hayashi of Namco Ltd. invented a variant of the Invade-a-Load technique for use with optical disc based platforms such as PlayStation and applied for a patent. U.S. patent 5,718,632 was granted in February 1998 and assigned to Namco despite the Invade-a-Load prior art. The technique was used for Ridge Racer.

== See also ==
- Commodore 64 disk / tape emulation
