= MOS Technology CIA =

Integrated circuit

Pin configuration of the 6526 CIA

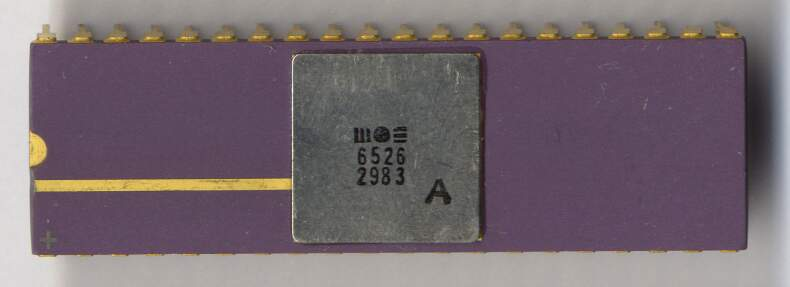
Early 6526 CIA were still in costly ceramic package with gold contacts. Later versions were produced in cheaper plastic package.

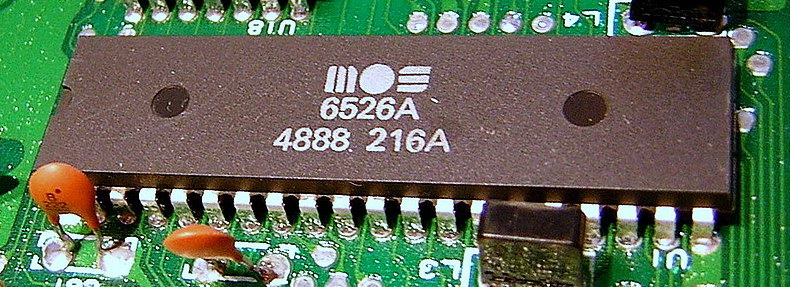
CIA MOS 6526A in plastic package

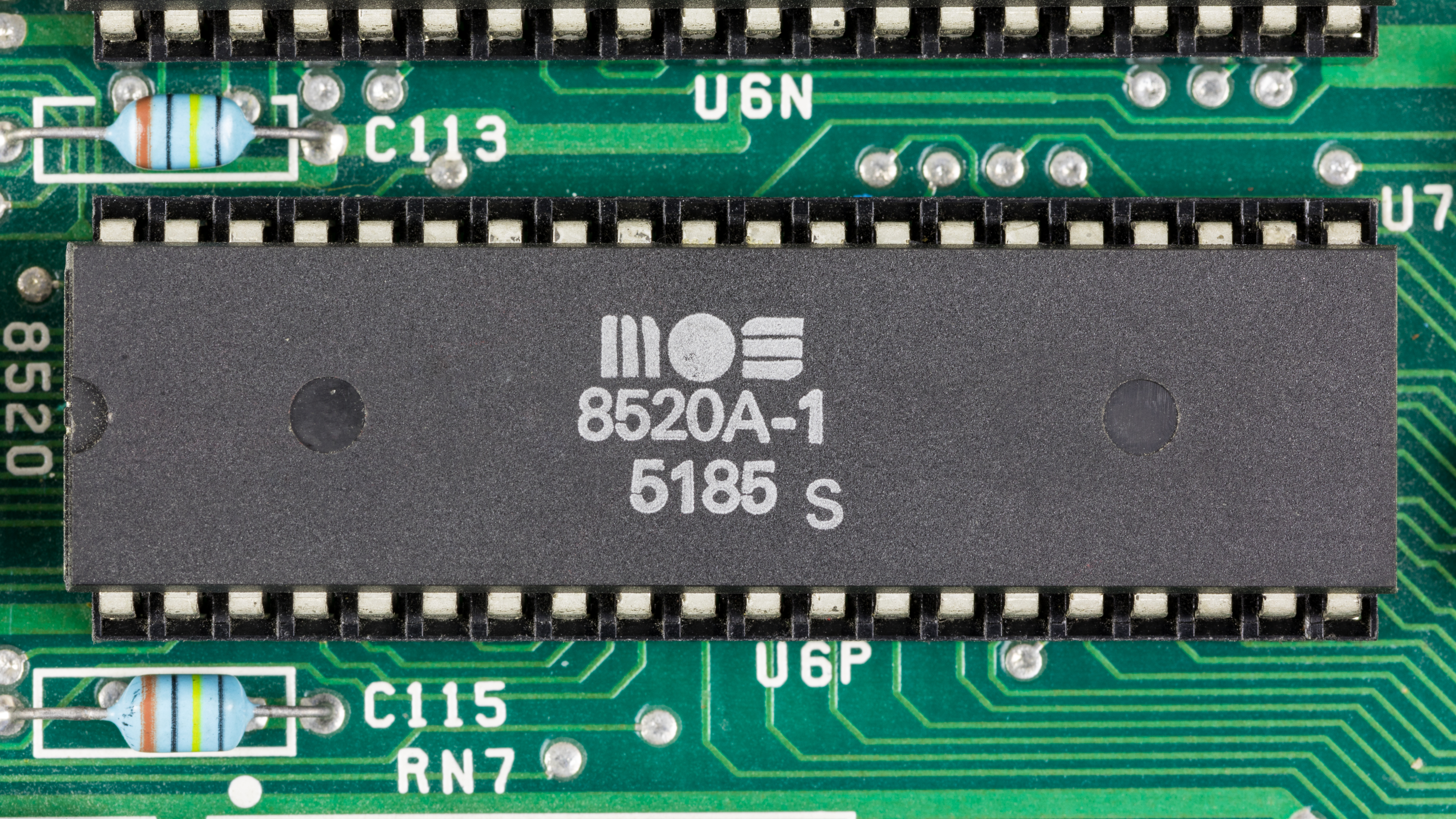
MOS 8520A in an Amiga 1000

The 6526 or 8520 Complex Interface Adapter (CIA) was an integrated circuit made by MOS Technology. Developed from the earlier 6522 VIA, it originally served as an I/O port controller for the 6502 family of microprocessors, providing for parallel and serial I/O capabilities as well as timers and a Time-of-Day (TOD) clock. The 6526's most prominent use was in the Commodore 64 and Commodore 128(D), each of which included two CIA chips. The Commodore 1570 and Commodore 1571 floppy disk drives also contained one CIA each. The 8520, a version of the 6526 with modified TOD circuitry, was used in the Amiga home computer and the Commodore 1581 floppy disk drive. Neither design was licensed to third parties, and was used only within Commodore.

== Parallel I/O ==
The CIA had two 8-bit bidirectional parallel I/O ports. Each port had a corresponding Data Direction Register, which allowed each data line to be individually set to input or output mode. A read of these ports always returned the status of the individual lines, regardless of the data direction that had been set.

== Serial I/O ==
An internal bidirectional 8-bit shift register enabled the CIA to handle serial I/O. The chip could accept serial input clocked from an external source, and could send serial output clocked with one of the built-in programmable timers. An interrupt was generated whenever an 8-bit serial transfer had completed. It was possible to implement a simple "network" by connecting the shift register and clock outputs of several computers together. The maximum bitrate is 500 kbit/s for the 2 MHz version.

The earlier 6522 VIA's implementation of the shift register included a fault that, in the VIC-20, prevented its use for fast data transfers with the 1540 disk drive. This fault was corrected in the 6526, but the shift register remained unused in the Commodore 64 to maintain compatibility with VIC-20 drives.

== Interval timers ==
Two programmable interval timers were available, each with sub-microsecond precision. Each timer consisted of a 16-bit read-only presettable down counter and a corresponding 16-bit write-only latch. Whenever a timer was started, the timer's latch was automatically copied into its counter, and the counter would then decrement with each clock cycle until underflow, at which an interrupt would be generated if the CIA was configured to do so.

The timer could run in either "one-shot" mode, halting after underflowing, or "continuous" mode, reloading the latch value and starting the timer cycle anew. In addition to generating interrupts, the timer output could also be gated to the second I/O port.

As configured in the Commodore 64 and Commodore 128, the CIA's timing was controlled by the Ø2 system clock, nominally one MHz. This meant that the timers decremented at approximately one microsecond intervals, the exact time period being determined by whether the system used the NTSC or PAL video standard. In the C-128, clock stretching was employed so the CIA's timing was unaffected by whether the system was running in SLOW or FAST mode.

It was possible to generate relatively long timing intervals by programming timer B to count timer A underflows. If both timers were loaded with the maximum interval value of 65,535, a timing interval of one hour, 11 minutes, 34 seconds would result.

== Time-of-Day (TOD) Clock ==
A real-time clock is incorporated in the CIA, providing a timekeeping device more appropriate to human needs than the microsecond precision of the interval timers. Time is kept in the American 12-hour AM/PM format. The TOD clock consists of four read/write registers: hours (with bit 7 acting as the AM/PM flag), minutes, seconds and tenths of a second. All registers read out in BCD format, thus simplifying the encoding/decoding process.

Reading from the registers will always return the time of day. In order to avoid a carry error while fetching the time, reading the hours register will immediately halt register updating, with no effect on internal timekeeping accuracy. Once the tenths register has been read, updating will resume. It is possible to read any register other than the hours register "on the fly," making the use of a running TOD clock as a timer a practical application. If the hours register is read, however, it is essential to subsequently read the tenths register. Otherwise, all TOD registers will remain "frozen."

Setting the time involves writing the appropriate BCD values into the registers. A write access to the hours register will completely halt the clock. The clock will not start again until a value has been written into the tenths register. Owing to the order in which the registers appear in the system's memory map, a simple loop is all that is required to write the registers in the correct order. It is permissible to write to only the tenths register to "nudge" the clock into action, in which following a hardware reset, the clock will start at 1:00:00.0.

In addition to its timekeeping features, the TOD can be configured to act as an alarm clock, by arranging for it to generate an interrupt request at any desired time. Due to a bug in many 6526s (see also errata below), the alarm IRQ would not always occur when the seconds component of the alarm time is exactly zero. The workaround is to set the alarm's tenths value to 0.1 seconds.

The TOD clock's internal circuitry is designed to be driven by either a 50 or 60 Hz sine wave signal. In the Commodore 64 and Commodore 128(D), the computer's power supply derived a clock signal from the AC input, resulting in stable timekeeping with little long-term drift. The ability to work with both frequencies allowed a single version of the 6526 to be used in computers deriving a clock signal from 50 or 60 Hz power, or using a dedicated crystal as in the Commodore SX-64. The Commodore 64's KERNAL operating system determines the video standard during system startup, but does not attempt to identify the supplied TOD clock frequency or initialise the CIAs correctly on 50 Hz-driven machines, so it is the responsibility of any application software that wants to use either CIA's TOD function to determine the supplied frequency and set the CIA(s) flag accordingly to ensure accurate timekeeping.

The 8520 revision of the CIA, as used in the Amiga and the Commodore 1581 disk drive, modified the time-of-day clock to be a 24-bit binary counter, replacing the BCD format of the 6526. Other behavior was similar, however.

== Versions ==
The CIA was available in 1 MHz (6526), 2 MHz (6526A) and 3 MHz (6526B) versions. The package was a JEDEC-standard 40-pin ceramic or plastic DIP. The 8520 CIA, with its modified time-of-day clock, was used in the Amiga computers.

Commodore embedded reduced (just 4 registers) CIA-like logic for the cost reduced Commodore 1571 inside the C128DCR (See Commodore 128) in a gate array called 5710 which also contains other functions. The 5710 CIA has the serial clock for the fast serial interface hardwired to a CIA6526 equivalent Timer A value of 5, leading to a per-bit time of 5 μs on transmission. This is different from what used to be a Timer A value of 6 in the 6526 CIA in the original Commodore 1571. The 5710 CIA does not contain timer or timer control registers. It only contains two port registers and the register to control the serial shifter and its event.

== Errata ==
In addition to the aforementioned alarm clock interrupt bug, many CIAs exhibited a defect in which the part would fail to generate a timer B hardware interrupt if the interrupt control register (ICR) was read one or two clock cycles before the time when the interrupt should have actually occurred. This defect, as well as logic errors in the Commodore provided (8 bit) operating system, caused frequent pseudo-RS-232 errors in the Commodore 64 and Commodore 128 computers when running at higher baud rates.
