= Commodore SX-64 =

Portable version of the Commodore 64 computer

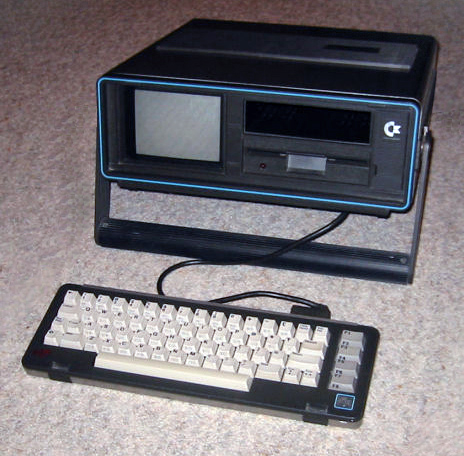
- Type: Portable computer
- Released: December 1983; 42 years ago
- Introductory price: US$995 (1984) equivalent to $3,100 in 2025
- Discontinued: 1986
- Operating system: Commodore KERNAL; Commodore BASIC 2.0
- CPU: MOS Technology 6510 @ 1.02 MHz (NTSC version) @ 0.985 MHz (PAL version)
- Memory: 64 KB RAM + 20 KB ROM
- Graphics: VIC-II (320 x 200, 16 colors, sprites, raster interrupt)
- Sound: SID 6581 (3x Osc, 4x Wave, Filter, ADSR, Ring)
- Connectivity: 2x CIA 6526 Joystick, Power, ROM cartridge (modified), S-Video, CBM-488 Floppy/Printer, GPIO/RS-232
- Predecessor: None
- Successor: Commodore LCD

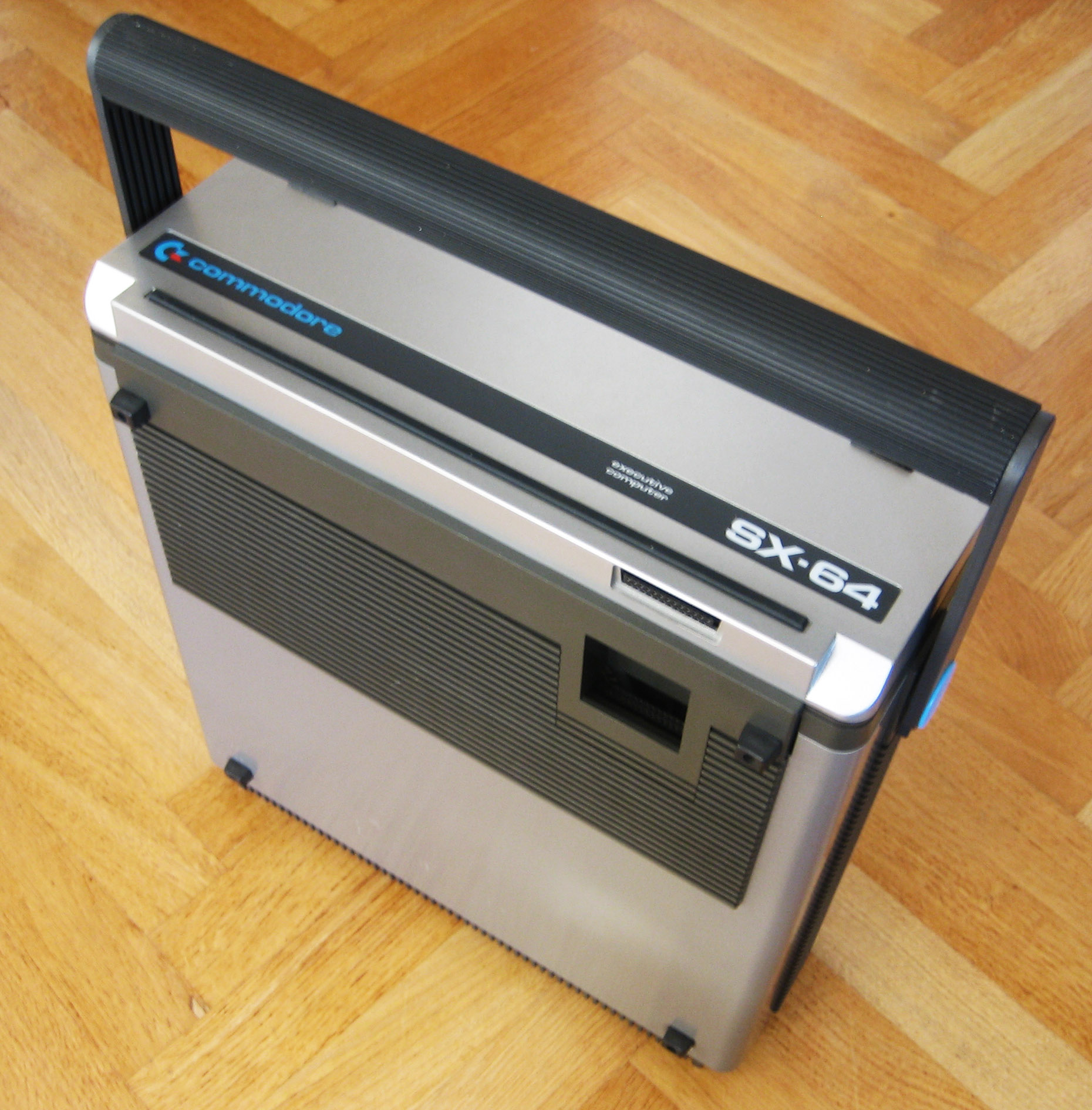
Housing with keyboard locked on, standing

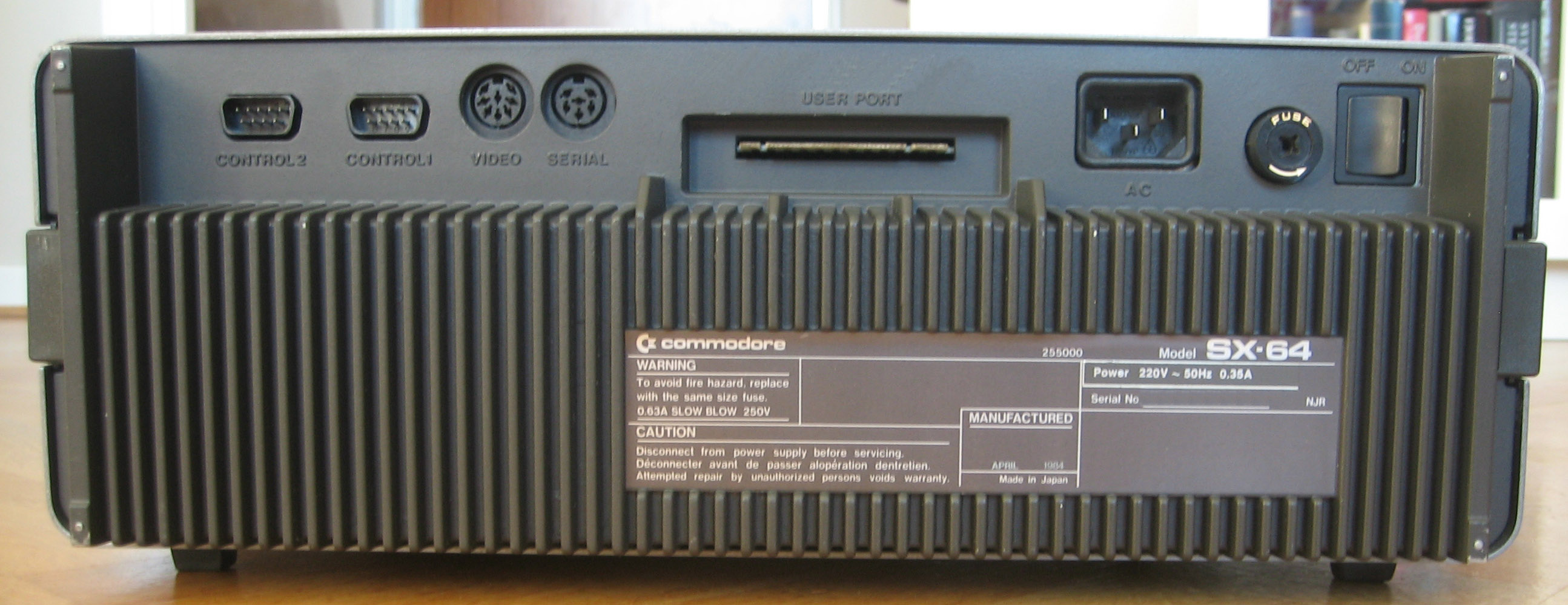
Rear

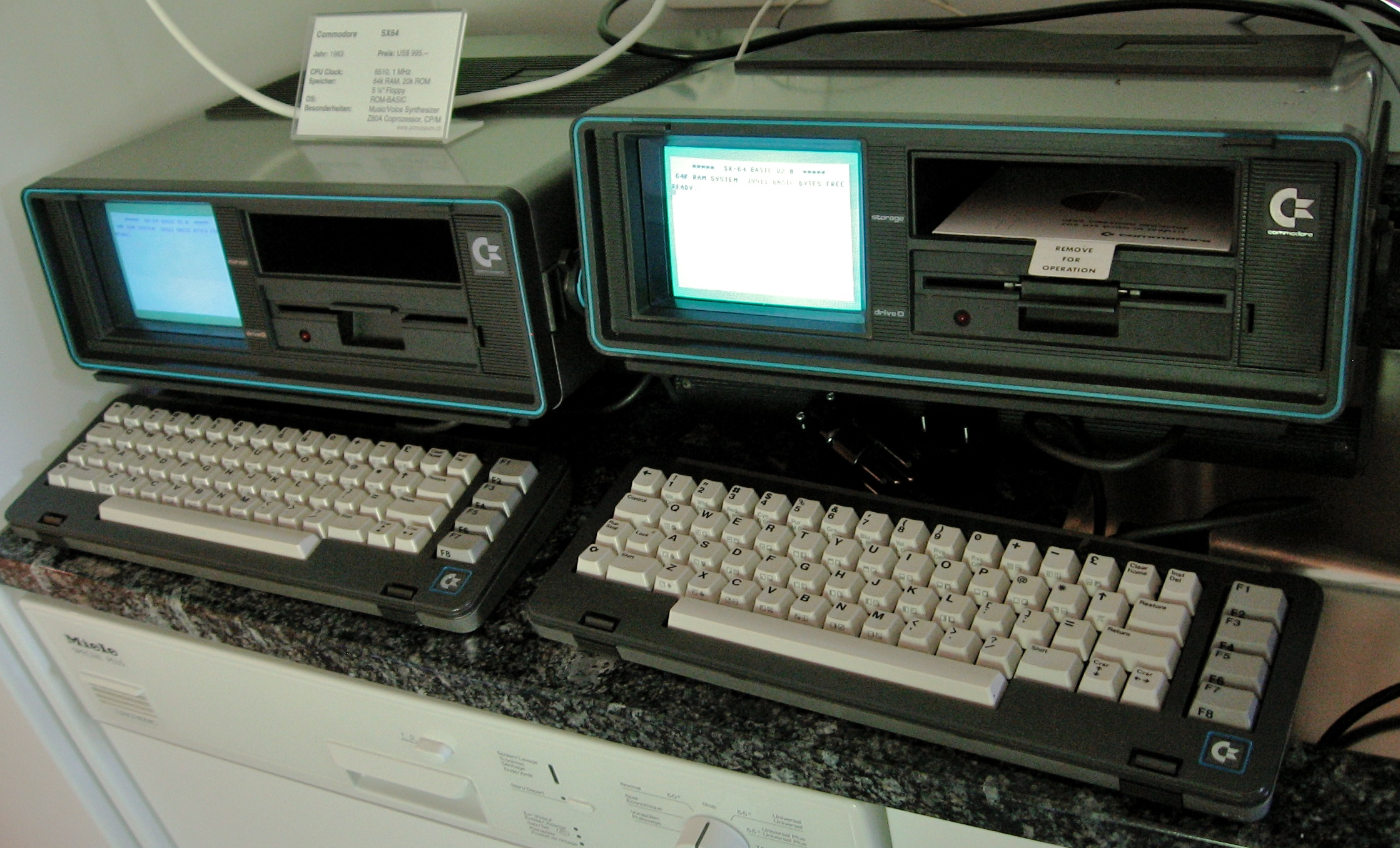
Two Commodore SX-64 computers showing their SX-64 BASIC 2.0 startup screens. (Note the white screen background color.)

The Commodore SX-64, also known as the Executive 64, or VIP-64 in Europe, is a portable, briefcase/suitcase-size "luggable" version of the popular Commodore 64 home computer and the first color portable computer.

The SX-64 features a built-in five-inch composite monitor and a built-in 1541 floppy drive. It weighs 10.5 kg (23 lb). The machine is carried by its sturdy handle, which doubles as an adjustable stand. It was announced in January 1983 and released eleven months later in December 1983, at US$995 (equivalent to $3,083 in 2025).

== Description ==
Aside from its built-in features and different form factor, there are several other differences between the SX-64 and the regular C64. The default screen color is changed to blue text on a white background for improved readability on the smaller screen. This can cause compatibility problems with programs that assume the C64's default blue background. The default device for load and save operations is changed to the floppy drive.

The Datasette (cassette) port and RF port were omitted from the SX-64. Because it has a built-in disk drive and monitor, Commodore did not perceive a need for a tape drive or television connector. However, the lack of a Datasette port poses a problem for a number of C64 Centronics parallel printer interfaces, since several popular designs "borrowed" their +5V power supply from the port. This was not an issue for later interfaces which were supplied with an AC adapter power supply, or those which can use the +5V line supplied by the Centronics port (Pin #18) on the printer itself, if the printer implements it. Alternatively, a +5V supply is also available from the joystick ports.

The audio/video port is still present, so an external monitor can still be used; it displays the same content as the built-in monitor. Differences, electrically and in placement on the board, means that there are compatibility problems with some C64 cartridges.

The original SX-64's (built in) power supply limits the machine's expandability.

Compatibility with Commodore RAM Expansion Units varies. Early SX-64 power supplies cannot handle the extra power consumption from the REU. The physical placement of the cartridge port can prevent the REU from seating properly. The 1700 and 1750, 128K and 512K units intended for the C128, are said to work more reliably with the SX-64 than the 1764 unit that was intended for the regular C64. Some SX-64 owners modify Commodore REUs to use an external power supply in order to get around the power supply issues. IDE64 is also non-compatible at the present time. When it is powered up, the screen sends out the C64 breadbin "blue" background with the typical 38911 BASIC BYTES FREE, and immediately under the READY prompt a statement of RAM is displayed.

A version of the SX-64 with dual floppy drives, known as the DX-64, was announced, but the press reported by early 1985 that plans for its release had been suspended. A few have been reported to exist, but it is very rare. Instead of an extra floppy drive, a modem could also be built in above the first drive. Some hobbyists installed a second floppy drive themselves in the SX-64's empty drive slot. Later models of the SX-64 use the larger power supply intended for use with the DX-64.

At around the same time the SX-64 was announced in January 1983, a version with a monochrome screen called the SX-100 was announced. Despite releasing plans by June 1983, it was never released.

== History ==
The SX-64 did not sell well, and its failure has been variously attributed to its small screen, excessive weight (10.5 kg or 23.1 lb), poor marketing, and smaller business software library than that of its competitors, which included the Osborne 1 and Kaypro II (Zilog Z80 CPU, CP/M OS) and Compaq Portable (16-bit CPU, MS-DOS).

The exact number of SX-64 sold from 1984 to 1986, when it was discontinued, is unknown. The serial numbers of over 130 SX-64s from series GA1, GA2, GA4, GA5 and GA6, with serial numbers ranging over 49,000 for series GA1, 1,000 for GA2, 17,000 for GA4, 11,000 for GA5, and 7,000 for GA6 have been reported

Some would-be buyers waited instead for the announced DX-64, which never became widely available due to the slow sales of the SX-64, creating a "catch-22" situation similar to that endured by Osborne after announcing an improved version of its computer. The SX-64 did however gain a following with user groups and software developers, who could quickly pack and unpack the machine to use for copying software or giving demonstrations.

== Reception ==
Ahoy! favorably reviewed the SX-64, stating that the keyboard was better than the 64's, the monitor "isn't hard to read at all", and the disk drive was durable enough for travel. While criticizing the lack of any provision for internal or external battery power, the magazine concluded that the average $750–800 retail price was "worth every penny".

== Technical information ==
Like the Commodore 64, except for the following differences:

- Built-in storage: 170 KB 5¼" floppy disk drive (internal version of the Commodore 1541)
- Built-in display: 5" inch (127 mm) composite color monitor (CRT)
- Keyboard: Separate unit, connected by cord to CPU unit
- Cartridge port: Placed on top of CPU unit, w/spring-loaded fold-in lid, cartridges inserted vertically (vs horizontally into back of C64)
- I/O connectors:
  - Serial "488" interface (rear)
  - Video out connector (rear)
  - User Port (rear)
  - Cartridge Port (beneath two spring-loaded flaps on the case top)
  - No Datassette interface
  - No RF modulator & connector
  - Non-standard 25-pin keyboard connector below right side of front panel. The connectors are similar but not identical to D-subminiature connectors and notoriously hard to find today
  - Standard three-prong IEC C14 AC power connector (vs C64 DIN plug to "power brick" PSU)
- Power supply: Internal unit with transformer and rectifiers (vs external C64 PSU)
- Extra features: Floppy disk storage compartment above disk drive which could be used to build in an extra floppy drive or compatible sized modem
