= Commodore bus =

Serial bus of the home computers series of Commodore

Commodore serial
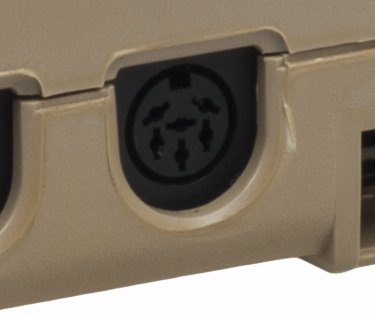
- Type: Peripheral bus

Production history
- Designer: Commodore International
- Designed: 1980; 46 years ago
- Manufacturer: Various
- Produced: 1980–present

General specifications
- Length: 1.8 meters maximum
- Hot pluggable: No
- Daisy chain: Yes, up to 31 devices
- External: Yes
- Pins: 6
- Connector: DIN connector

Electrical
- Signal: Open collector 5 V
- Max. voltage: 5 V
- Max. current: 3.2 mA

Data
- Data signal: Yes
- Bitrate: 3.2–41.6 kbit/s
- Protocol: Serial

Pinout
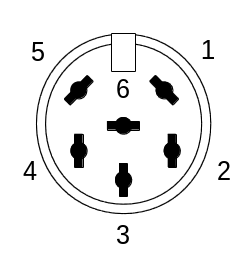
- Female socket from the front.
Pin 1	SRQ	Service Request
Pin 2	GND	Ground
Pin 3	ATN	Attention
Pin 4	CLK	Clock
Pin 5	DATA	Data
Pin 6	RESET	Reset

The Commodore serial bus (IEC Bus), is Commodore's interface for primarily magnetic disk data storage and printers for Commodore 8-bit home computers: VIC-20, Commodore 64, Commodore 128, Plus/4, Commodore 16, and Commodore 65.

== Description and history ==
The parallel IEEE-488 interface used on the Commodore PET (1977) computer line was too costly, so a cost-reduced version was developed, which consisted of a stripped-down, serial version of the IEEE-488 interface, with only a few signals remaining; however, the general protocol layout was kept. Commodore began using this bus with the VIC-20 (1980). Connection to the computer uses a DIN-6 connector (DIN 45322).

== Transfer speed ==
Setup	Speed	Effective bitrate
Commodore 64 + 1541	400 bytes/s	3 200 bit/s
Commodore 64 + 1541 with fast loader	2560 bytes/s	20 480 bit/s
Commodore 128 + 1571	5200 bytes/s	41 600 bit/s
Theoretical 20 μs	6250 bytes/s	50 000 bit/s

== Interface ==
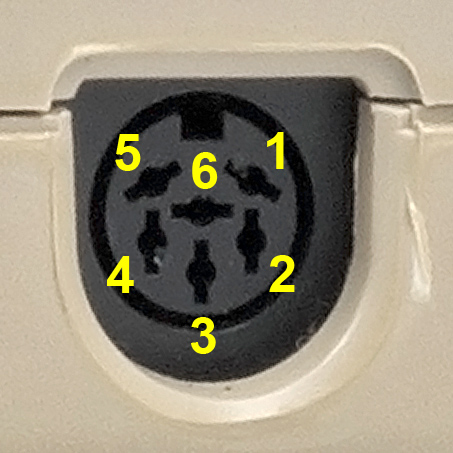

Pinout
Pin	Name	Function
1	/SRQIN	Service request input to let peripherals request to be served by the host (C64). Used by the C128 for fast transfers.
2	GND	Ground
3	/ATN	Serial ATN In/out. Set low by the host (C64) to indicate the beginning of a serial data transfer.
4	/CLK	Serial CLK In/out. Used for software handshaking.
5	/DATA	Serial DATA In/out. Data bit transfer.
6	/RESET	Resets peripherals and also resets an older C64.

== Protocol description ==
The bus signals are digital single-ended open collector five-volt TTL and active when low. Bus devices have to provide their own power.

Because the bus lines are electrically open collector it works like a long OR gate between all device line drivers. The logical value for ground is true and vice versa. Any device may set a line "true". A line only becomes "false" if all devices signal false.

Transmission begins with the bus talker holding the Clock line true, and the listener(s) holding the Data line true. To begin the talker releases the Clock line to false. When all bus listeners are ready to receive they release the Data line to false. If the talker waits more than 200 μs without the Clock line going true (idle state), listeners have to perform End-or-Identify (EOI).

If the Data line being false (released) isn't acknowledged by the talker within 200 μs, the listener knows that the talker is in the process of EOI that means "this character will be the last one". When the listener detects the 200 μs timeout, it must acknowledge this by pulling the Data line true for at least 60 μs, and then release it. The talker can revert to transmitting again within 60 μs by pulling the Clock line true.

Data is eight bits starting with the least significant bit. The Data line is set according to the bit to send (1=true=ground). Once the Data line is set, the Clock line is released to false. The Clock and Data lines will be held steady for at least 20 μs (except for Commodore 64 that needs 60 μs). After 8 bits has been sent, the talker releases the Data line to false and the listener then acknowledge the talker by pulling the Data line true within 1000 μs. After this the talker sets the Clock line true and listener sets the Data line true thus back where the transmission begun. If an EOI is signaled by holding the Clock line false the transmission is ended and the listener acknowledge this by pulling the Data line true for 200 μs.

The ATN line is set to true and bytes are sent like above to all devices, but the byte is interpreted as one of the commands "Talk," "Listen," "Untalk," and "Unlisten". That tell a specific device to become a talker or listener. Only devices with matching device numbers switch into talk and listen mode. A secondary address may also follow.

On higher logical level the host will set the ATN line to true and transmit the bytes "Device number 8, listen", "Secondary address 2, open". Next it will set the ATN line false and the host then becomes the talker, holding the Clock line true. The device will be the listener, holding the Data line true. The host will transmit the specific open command and end it with an EOI signal sequence. After this the host will set with ATN line true, "Device number 8, unlisten". Followed up by ATN line true and "Device number 8, listen", "Secondary address 2, data". Then the host sets the ATN line false and sends the data. When the host has finished sending data the ATN line is set to true and "Device number 8, unlisten" is sent.

When it is necessary to switch roles and make the host a listener and the device a talker the occurs after a talk command has been sent to the device. The host sets the Data line true and releases the Clock line to false. The device waits for the Clock line to go false and then pulls it to true and release the Data line to false. After this sequence the standard talk-listener interaction may follow.

Bus commands
Code	Meaning
device | 0x20	Listen, device (0–30)
0x3F	Unlisten, all devices
device | 0x40	Talk, device
0x5F	Untalk, all devices
channel | 0x60	Reopen, channel (0–15)
channel | 0xE0	Close, channel
channel | 0xF0	Open, channel

To read a normal file from the floppy device number 8 the command LOAD "filename",8,1 is issued on a Commodore 64. That causes the following high level communication to take place:

High level protocol
Command	Destination	Meaning
/28	Device	Listen, device number 8
/F0	Device	Open channel 0
	Device	Send filename bytes
/3F	Devices	Unlisten all devices
/48	Device	Talk, Device number 8
/60	Device	Reopen channel 0
Device number 8 becomes the master of the bus
	Host	Receive byte data
The host becomes the master of the bus (normal operation)
/5F	Devices	Untalk all devices
/28	Device	Listen, device number 8
/E0	Device	Close channel 0
/3F	Devices	Unlisten all devices

The Commodore 1541 floppy drive uses a slower Commodore 64 compatible mode which can be deactivated for faster speed by using the command OPEN 15,8,15,"UI-":CLOSE 15.

== Device numbering ==
Device numbering per Commodore 64 KERNAL ROM
Device	Type
0	Keyboard
1	Cassette port
2	RS-232 on the user port or second cassette on PETs
3	Screen
4–5	Printer
6	Typically plotter device
7	Second plotter?
8–15	Disk (10 – used by some serial-to-parallel printer interfaces)
16–30	Unknown
31	Reserved as a command to all devices

Device numbers 0–3 are not associated with the Commodore bus.

== Host implementation ==
The VIC-20 computer and the Commodore 1540 and 1541 floppy drives use the MOS Technology 6522 VIA to handle IEC Bus transmissions. The Commodore 64 and 128 computers and the Commodore 1571 drive use the Complex Interface Adapter.

== Common devices ==
Device	Info
Commodore 1541	5 1/4-inch (130 mm) 170 KB floppy
Commodore 1570	5 1/4-inch (130 mm) 170 KB floppy
Commodore 1571	5 1/4-inch (130 mm) 350–410 KB floppy
Commodore 1581	3 1/2-inch (89 mm) 800 KB floppy
MSD SD-1/SD-2	5 1/4-inch (130 mm) single/dual 170 KB floppy
Commodore MPS 801	Dot-matrix printer
Commodore 1515	Dot-matrix printer
Commodore 1520	Ballpoint pen printer
Commodore VIC-1525	Dot-matrix printer
Commodore VIC-1526	Rebranded MPS 802, dot-matrix printer
Okimate 10	Dot-matrix printer
Commodore DPS-1101	Daisy wheel printer
INTERPOD	Standalone IEEE-488 + RS-232
VIC-20	1 MHz 5 KB computer
Commodore 64	1 MHz 64 KB computer
Commodore SX-64	1 MHz 64 KB computer
Commodore 128	2 MHz 128 KB computer
Commodore 16	1-2 MHz 16 KB computer
Plus/4	1.76 MHz 64 KB computer
Commodore 65	3.54 MHz 128 KB computer

== Devices ==
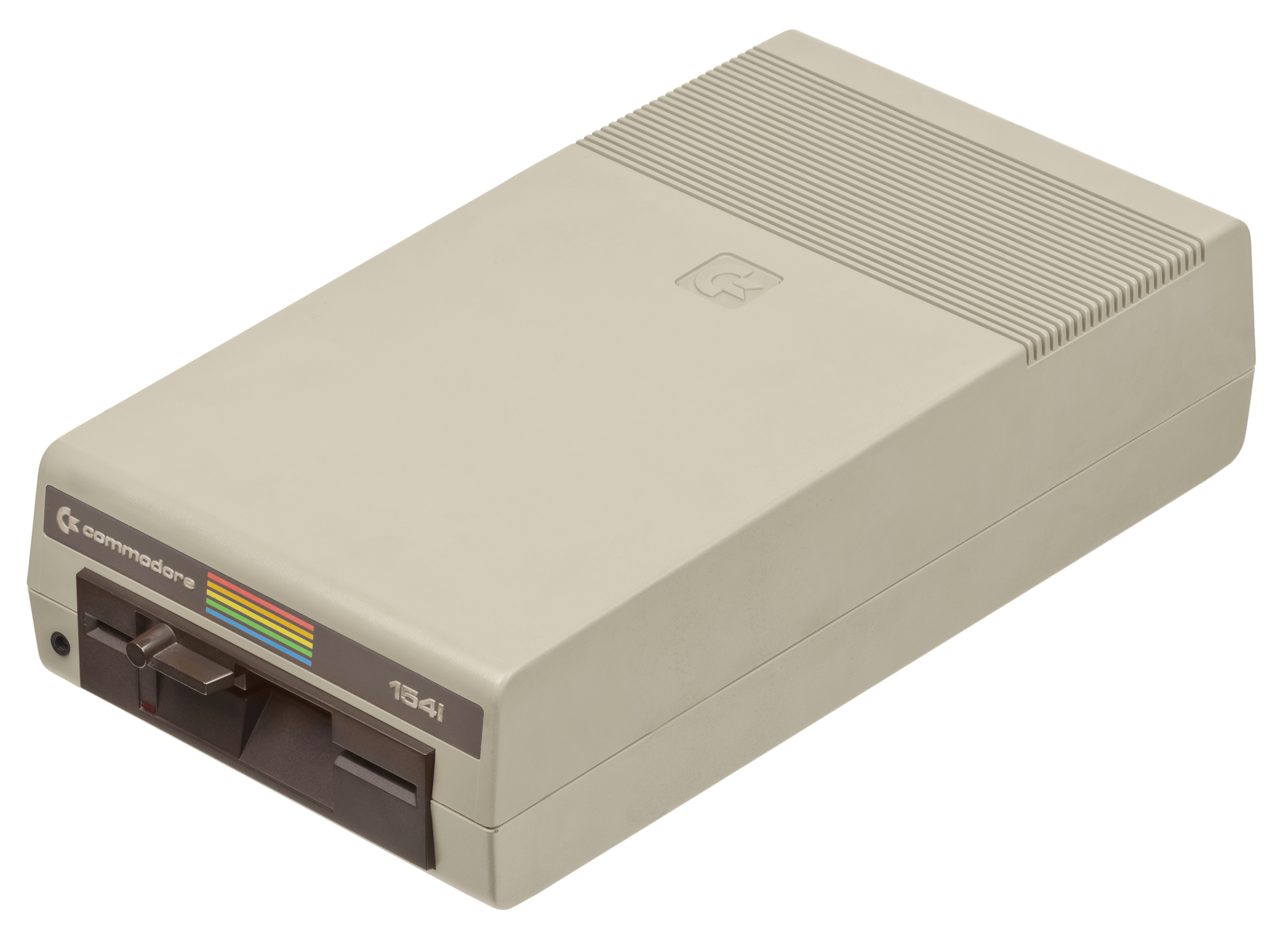
Commodore 1541 disk drive

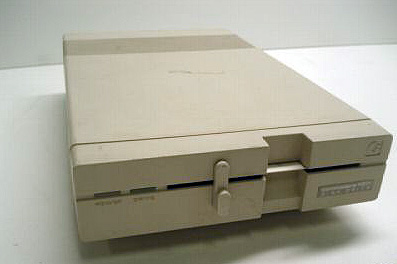
VC 1571 floppy drive

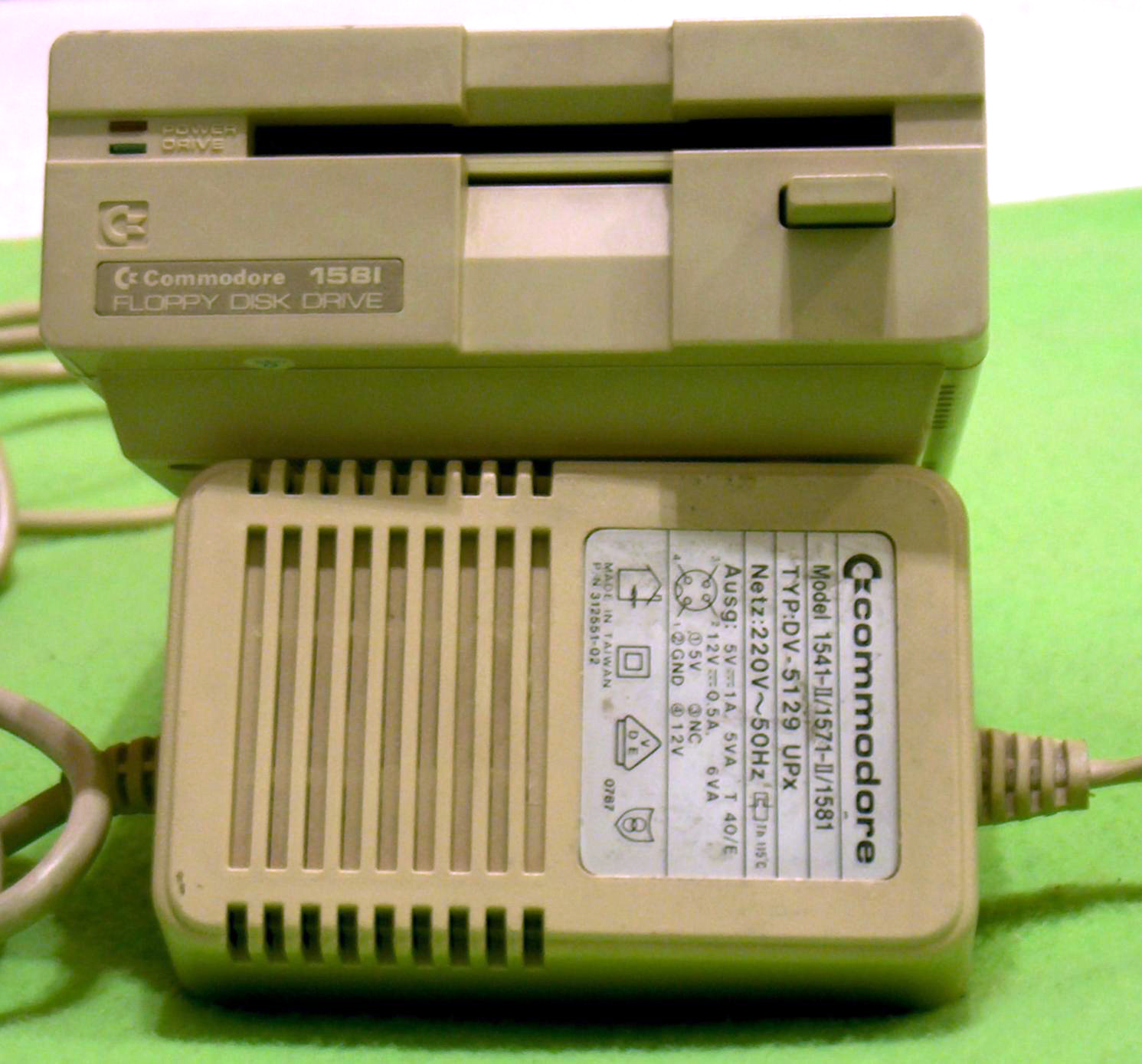
Commodore 1581 disk drive

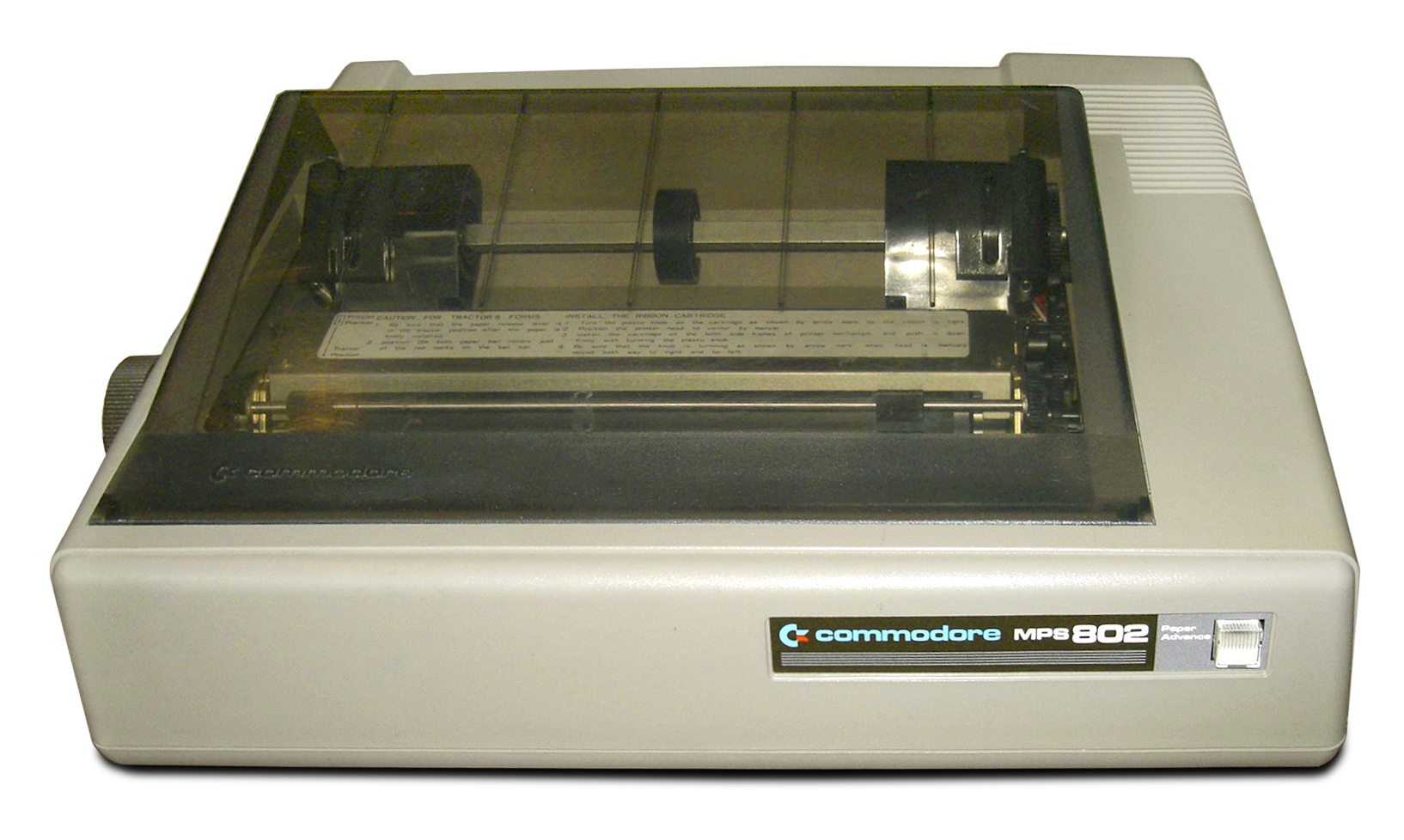
Commodore MPS 802 printer

== See also ==
- Commodore DOS
- Commodore 64 peripherals
- List of device bit rates
- Commodore 1541
- Fast loader
- Magnetic tape data storage
- IEEE-488, the original parallel version (originally HP-IB)
- HP-IL, another serialisation of IEEE-488
