= FastLoad =

FastLoad may refer to:

- Teradata FastLoad, a database utility
- Epyx FastLoad, a peripheral cartridge for the Commodore 64 computer
