= DOS Wedge =

Software

- Other names: DOS Support, DOS MANAGER
- Original authors: Bob Fairbairn, Bill Seiler
- Developer: Commodore International
- Initial release: 1982; 44 years ago
- Written in: MOS 6502 assembly language
- Operating system: Commodore 64, VIC-20
- Included with: Commodore 1541, C64 Macro Assembler
- Available in: English
- Type: System software

The DOS Wedge is a piece of Commodore 64 system software that was popular in its time. It was written by Bob Fairbairn, and was included by Commodore (CBM) on the 1541 disk drive Test/Demo Disk (filename: "DOS 5.1") and also packaged with the C64 Macro Assembler (filename: "DOS WEDGE64"). The DOS Wedge was referred to in the 1541 drive manual as DOS Support and on the software startup screen as DOS MANAGER. The original design was developed by Bill Seiler.

The Wedge made disk operations in BASIC 2.0 significantly easier by introducing several keyword shortcuts. The DOS Wedge became somewhat of a de facto standard, with third-party vendors such as Epyx often incorporating identical commands into fastloader cartridges and other Commodore 64 expansion devices. COMPUTE!'s Gazette published several type-in variations on the DOS Wedge, including a C128 version in its February 1987 issue (see External links, below).

The original Commodore DOS Wedge was a 1-KB program written in MOS 6502 assembly language. It resided in the otherwise unused memory block $CC00–$CFFF (52224–53247) and worked by altering BASIC's "CHRGET" subroutine at $0073 (115) so that each character passing by the BASIC interpreter would be checked for wedge commands, and the associated "wedged-in" routines run if needed.

== DOS Wedge functions ==
Any command that contains an @ symbol may substitute > instead, if desired.

/filename	Load a BASIC program into RAM
%filename	Load a machine language program into RAM
↑filename	Load a BASIC program into RAM and then automatically run it
←filename	Save a BASIC program to disk
@	Display (and clear) the disk drive status
@$	Display the disk directory without overwriting the BASIC program in memory
@command	Execute a disk drive command (e.g. S0:filename, V0:, I0:)
@Q	Deactivate the DOS Wedge

== See also ==
- Comparison of command shells
