= Epyx Fast Load =

Tool for Commodore 1541

The Epyx Fast Load is a floppy disk fast loader cartridge made by American software company Epyx in 1984 for the Commodore 64 home computer. It was programmed by Epyx employee Scott Nelson, who was originally a programmer for Starpath and later designed the Epyx Vorpal fastloading system for the company's games.

== Description ==
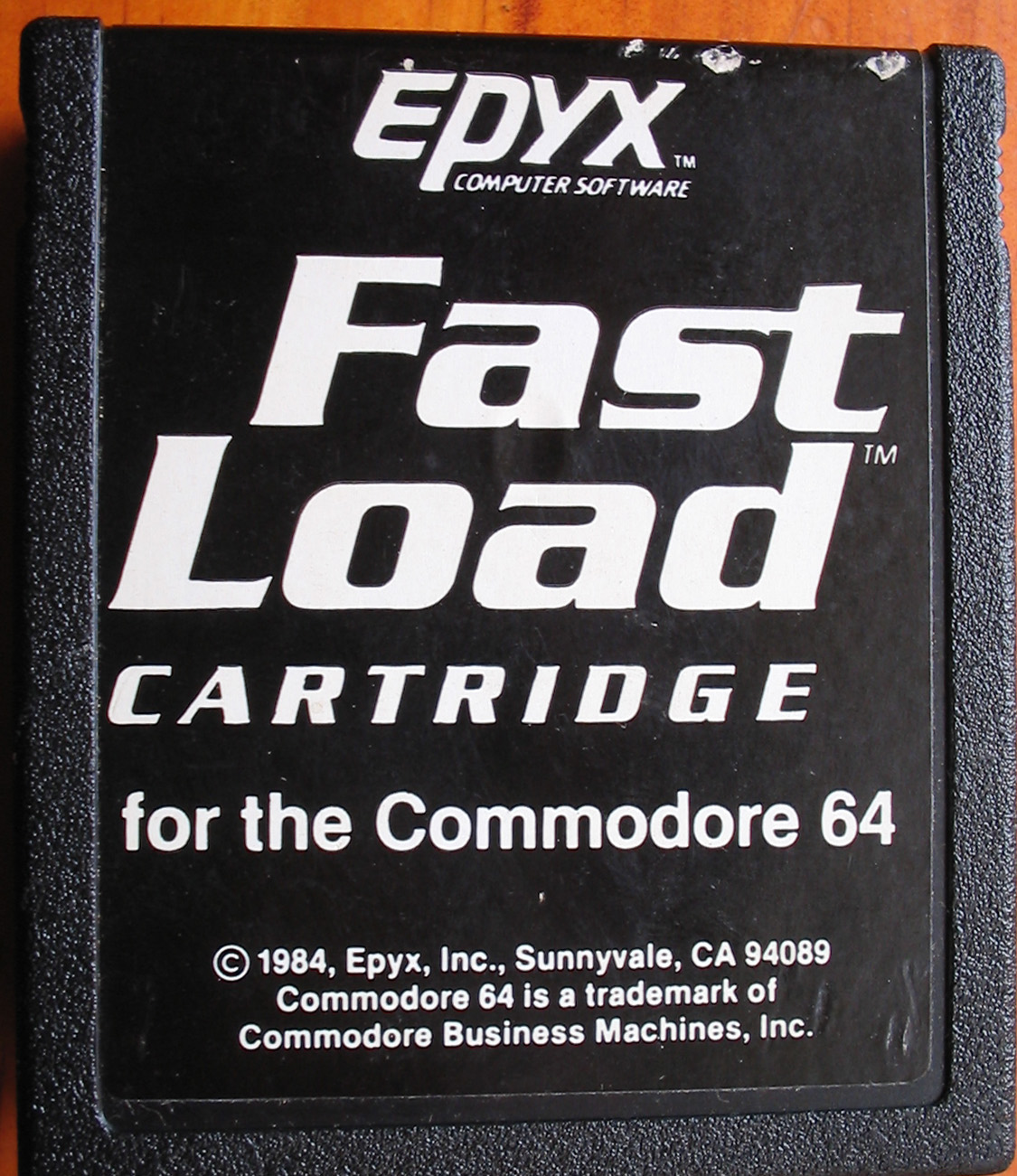
The Epyx Fast Load cartridge was a bestseller for the C64.

Epyx Fast Load allows programs to load from the Commodore 1541 disk drive at 2,500 bytes per second, approximately five times faster than the normal speed. Since it is stored on a cartridge, and thus provides instant access without requiring any hardware modification of the C64 or the disk drive, the Fast Load quickly became a very popular peripheral among C64 users.

In addition to disk acceleration, the cartridge also provides a built-in version of the Commodore DOS Wedge. This dramatically reduces the number of keystrokes needed to load or save files or perform disk operations, and makes the cartridge even more convenient.

Epyx Fast Load incorporates a machine language monitor. Although it does not include an assembler, as most "standard" C64 ML monitors do, it includes a wide array of powerful debugging tools. These include disassembly, single-stepping, and an automatic machine code relocator.

A crude disk editor is also included with the cartridge, which displays raw data from floppy disks in classical hex+ASCII split screen mode. Among other things, the disk editor can be used to enter cheat codes and do the home computer equivalent of ROM hacking.

In the unusual case of software that doesn't work with the Fast Load, the cartridge can be disabled via a menu command, thus avoiding the need to physically remove and reinsert it.

While the original 1984 version of the Fast Load will not work with the SD2IEC floppy drive emulation system, newer variants of the cartridge do support it.

== Reception ==
In a review of three Commodore 64 fast loaders, Ahoy! wrote that Fast Load "is surprisingly transparent to all the forms of commercial copy protection we have looked at ... In terms of greatest convenience and speed, we place our bets on" it.

Commodore Microcomputers found that Fast Load did not speed up all software but was very effective when it did. The magazine recommended buying the cartridge for the DOS Wedge and fast copying, with fastloading as a bonus. A review of five fast loaders in the magazine found that "Fast Load performed well during testing" and approved of its ease of use and documentation. However, the table included in the article showed that the cartridge only significantly sped up loading times for four of nine applications and games, not benefiting the others.
