= Fast Hack'em =

Commodore 64 software

This advertisement for Fast Hack'em, published in the September 1985 issue of COMPUTE!'s Gazette, describes the many features of this popular nibbler.

Fast Hack'em is a Commodore 64 fast disk/file copier, nibbler and disk editor written by Mike J. Henry and released in 1985. It was distributed in the U.S. and Canada via Henry's "Basement Boys Software", and in the U.K. via Datel Electronics. In the U.S., it retailed for $29.95 (equivalent to ~$100 in 2025).

== Controversy ==
The identity of Mike J. Henry remains a subject of discussion among Commodore 64 historians, with some suggesting that Henry is a pseudonym for Lawrence Hiler (occasionally spelled Hiller), who also used the alias "Mr. Nike." Proponents of this theory point to the fact that both names appear with identical credits for the same contributions on several Super Nintendo games. Furthermore, while Lawrence Hiler has appeared in public and represented Basement Boys Software, there are no known public records or appearances attributed to a "Mike J. Henry."

== Features ==
The most popular feature of Fast Hack'em was its ability to produce copies of copy-protected commercial software. When using the nibbler, disk copying is done on a very low level, bit-by-bit rather than using standard Commodore DOS commands. This effectively nullifies the efficacy of deliberate disk errors, non-standard track layouts, and related forms of copy prevention. Copying a protected disk takes approximately 60 seconds if being copied directly to another disk drive, or three minutes (plus several disk swaps) if performed using a single disk drive.

Fast Hack'em also includes a very fast disk copier that can copy unprotected disks at even higher speeds. Only 35 seconds are required with two drives, or two minutes plus swapping time with one drive.

For all forms of copying, Fast Hack'em can verify the resulting disk copies to ensure that they were properly written.

The MSD SD-2 dual drive is supported, with copies finished in 60 seconds, about twice as fast as without the software.

Fast Hack'em was updated often, and later versions added more copying options. The one feature that stood out from other copying programs was that these updates include parameters. They include the methods of copy protection individual programs use so even a fast copy can then be artificially re-protected and give a working copy.

In later versions of Fast Hack'em, disk copying can be performed without the computer if two Commodore 1541 disk drives are available. The software is loaded with a Commodore 64, the two-drive option is selected which transfers software to the drives' controller memory, and the serial cable can be disconnected from the computer. Any number of copies can be performed as long as neither drive is powered down.

== Reception ==
Ahoy! in October 1985 called Fast Hack'em "a must-needed utility for Commodore disk users" and "probably the fastest way to copy an entire 1541-formatted disk at the present time", joking that a disadvantage was the end of "leisurely coffee breaks or refrigerator raids" during copying. Info described Fast Hack'em as "the most extraordinary copy program I have ever seen for the 64", stating that copying a disk in 35 seconds with two 1541 drives was "not even enough time to fill out the label".
