= Commodore 1540 =

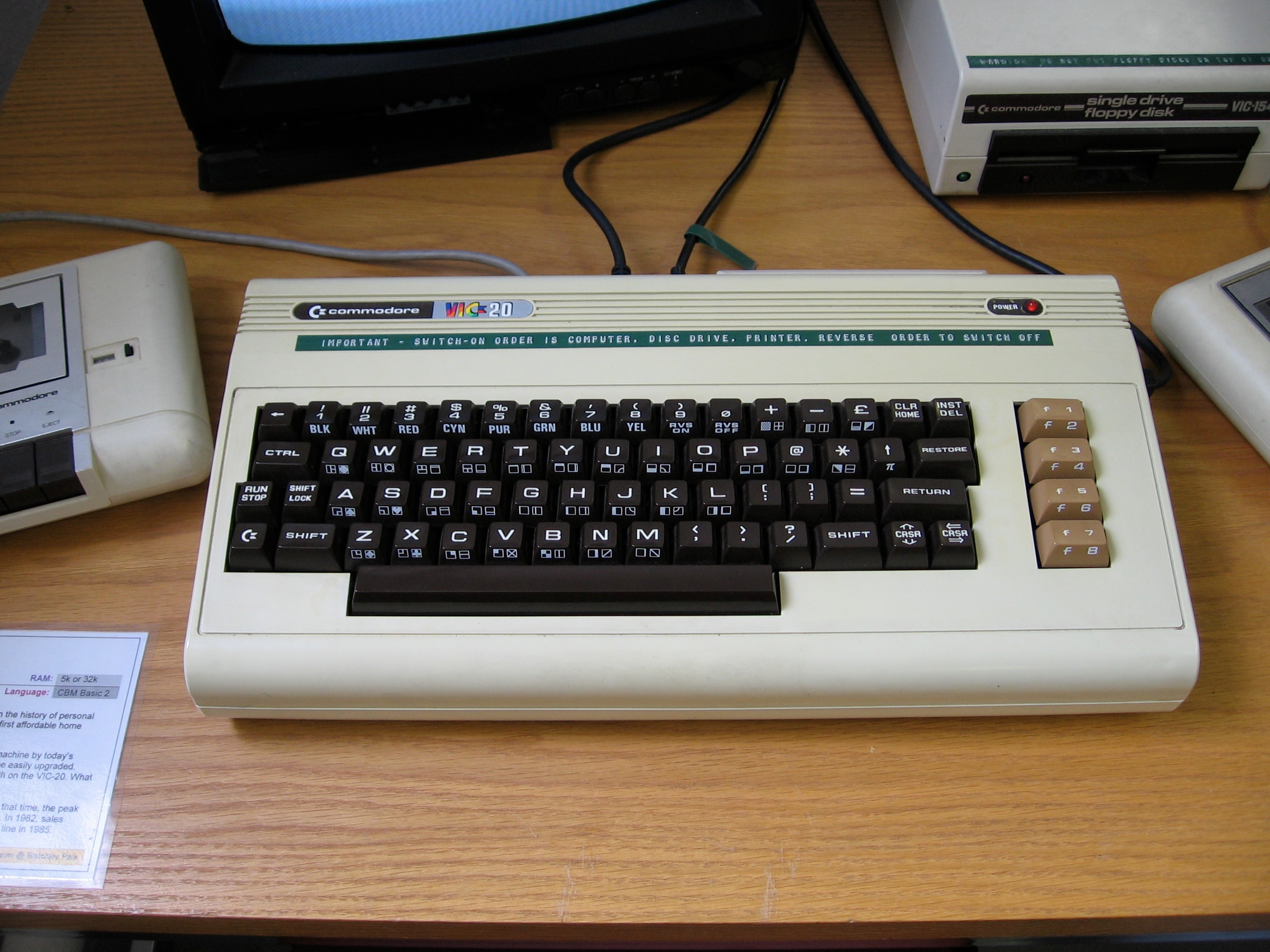
- A VIC-20 with connected 1540 disk drive seen in the upper-right of the image.
- Manufacturer: Commodore Business Machines
- Type: Floppy disk drive
- Release date: 1981
- Discontinued: 1983
- Media: 5¼" floppy disk SS SD
- Operating system: CBM DOS 2.6
- CPU: MOS 6502 @ 1 MHz
- Memory: 2 kB RAM, 16kB ROM
- Storage: 170 kB
- Connectivity: Commodore proprietary serial IEEE-488 0.4 kB/s
- Power: 100, 120, 220, or 240 V 50/60 Hz 25 W (30 W max)
- Backward compatibility: VIC-20
- Successor: Commodore 1541
- Related: Commodore 1570; Commodore 1571

The Commodore 1540 (also known as the VIC-1540) is the companion floppy disk drive for the VIC-20 home computer. It was introduced in 1982. It uses single-sided 5¼" floppy disks, on which it stores roughly 170 kB of data using Commodore's GCR data encoding scheme.

Because of the low price of both the VIC-20 and the 1540, this combination was the first computer with a disk drive to be offered on the US market for less than $1000 USD, although the combination of the Commodore 64 and 1541 would prove more enduring. The 1540 is an "intelligent peripheral" in that it has its own MOS Technology 6502 CPU (just like its VIC-20 host) and the resident Commodore DOS on board in ROM – contrary to almost all other home computer systems of the time, where the disk operating system was loaded from a boot floppy and was executed on the computer's CPU.

Due to a timing conflict with the C64's video chip, the C64 doesn't work properly with the 1540. The better-known 1541 is mechanically and nearly electronically identical to the 1540 but has a revised ROM that permits it to work with the C64 by slowing the drive down slightly. It is possible to put the 1541 into 1540 mode with a BASIC command (OPEN 15,8,15, "UI-" : CLOSE 15) to permit better speed when used with a VIC-20.

While cheaper than most other drives of the day, it was more expensive than the VIC-20 computer itself, and the disk media was also still relatively pricey. Also, the relatively small memory of the VIC meant that the faster program loading times of the drive did not gain more than a few seconds compared to tape media. Thirdly, almost all commercial software for the VIC-20 was sold on cartridge or cassette tape media, giving low incentive to buy a floppy drive. The C64 followed close on the heels of the VIC-20, quickly discontinuing the 1540. Most 1540s still in existence were modified with a 1541 ROM so it would work with a C64.

The launch price in Germany was 1898 DM (approximate 970 EUR). The American version is named VIC 1540 and the German version VC 1540.
