= Warp Speed =

Warp Speed may refer to:

- Warp speed, a speed of warp drives, especially fictional ones from Star Trek; see Technology in Star Trek § Warp speeds
- Warp Speed, film made in 1981 with Adam West
- WarpSpeed, a 1992 videogame
- Operation Warp Speed, a 2020 U.S. government program to quickly develop COVID vaccines

== See also ==
- Warp Speed Chic, a 2018 short film by Arctic Monkeys
- Speed (disambiguation)
- Warp (disambiguation)
