= Interrupt control register =

Hardware register

An interrupt control register, or ICR, is a hardware register in a computer chip used to configure the chip to generate interrupts—to raise a signal on an interrupt line—in response to some event occurring within the chip or a circuit connected to the chip.

An Interrupt Control is usually used in Micro controllers to generate interrupts signals which tells the CPU to pause its current task and start executing another set of predefined activities.
