= Commodore 1570 =

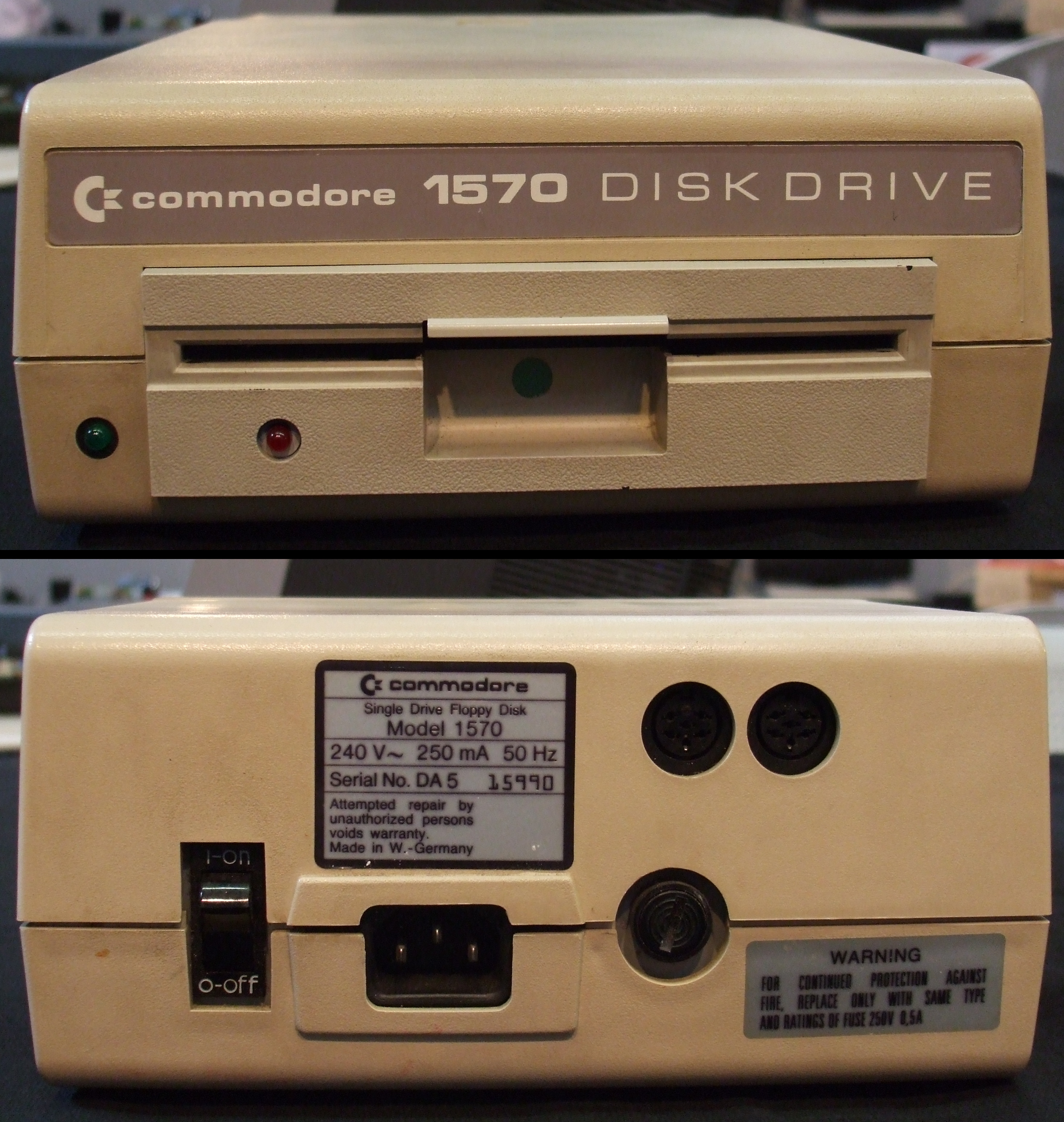
- Commodore 1570 floppy drive
- Manufacturer: Commodore Business Machines, Inc.
- Type: Floppy drive
- Media: 5¼" floppy disk SS DD using GCR or MFM
- Operating system: CBM DOS v3.0
- CPU: MOS 6502 @ 1-2 MHz, WD1770
- Memory: 2 kB RAM 32 kB ROM
- Storage: 170 kB (GCR); 200 kB (MFM)
- Connectivity: Commodore proprietary serial IEEE-488 5200 bytes/s
- Backward compatibility: Commodore 64, Commodore 128
- Predecessor: Commodore 1541
- Successor: Commodore 1571

The Commodore 1570 is a 5¼" floppy disk drive for the Commodore 128 home/personal computer. It is a single-sided, 170 kB version of the Commodore 1571, released as a stopgap measure when Commodore International was unable to provide sufficient quantities of 1571s due to a shortage of double-sided drive mechanisms (which were supplied by an outside manufacturer). Like the 1571, it can read and write both GCR and MFM disk formats. The 1570 utilizes a 1571 logic board in a cream-colored original-1541-like case with a drive mechanism similar to the 1541's except that it was equipped with track-zero detection. Like the 1571, its built-in DOS provides a data burst mode for transferring data to the C128 computer at a faster speed than a 1541 can. Its ROM also contains some DOS bug fixes that didn't appear in the 1571 until much later. The 1570 can read and write all single-sided CP/M-format disks that the 1571 can access.

Although the 1570 is compatible with the Commodore 64, the C64 isn't capable of taking advantage of the drive's higher-speed operation, and when used with the C64 it is little more than a pricier 1541. Also, many early buyers of the C128 chose to temporarily make do with a 1541 drive, perhaps owned as part of a previous C64 setup, until the 1571 became more widely available.

The drive uses the CPU MOS 6502, floppy controller WD1770 or WD1772, I/O controllers 2x MOS Technology 6522 and 1x MOS Technology 6526.
