= 1541 Ultimate =

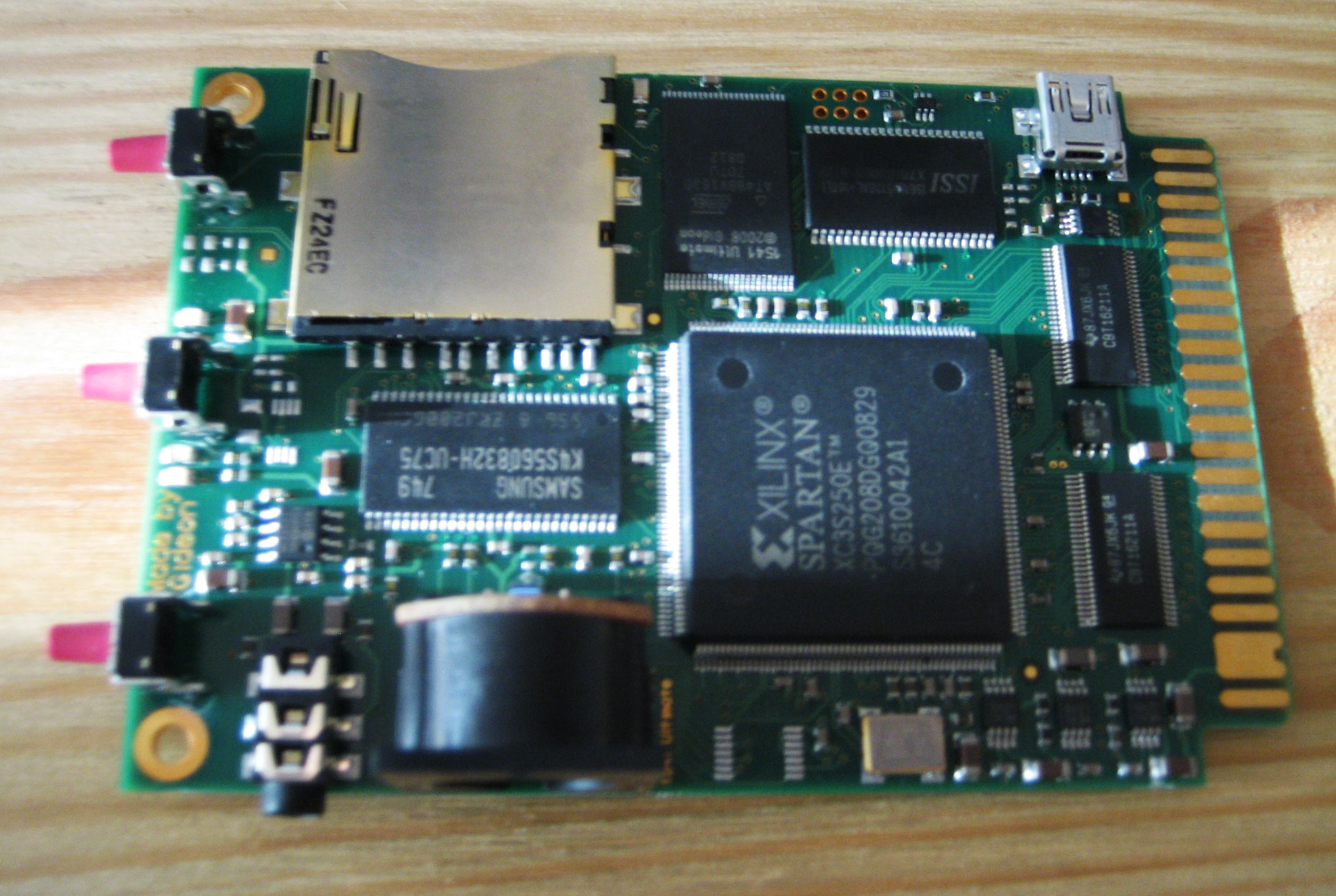
1541 Ultimate

1541 Ultimate (often abbreviated 1541U) is a peripheral, primarily an emulated floppy disk and cartridge emulator based on the FPGA Xilinx XC3S250E, for the Commodore 64 home computer. It became available in 2008.

The unit is developed by Gideon Zweijtzer and is a cartridge that can emulate other cartridges such as the Commodore REU, Action Replay, The Final Cartridge III, Super Snapshot V5, Retro Replay or TurboAss with Codenet-support, and an almost fully compatible (including JiffyDOS support) FPGA-cloned Commodore 1541 (including 1541, 1541C, and 1541 II models) floppy disk unit that can use Commodore 64-compatible files like .D64/.G64 disc images or .PRG files via a SD card reader. Additionally, the 1541 Ultimate is suitable for making archives of floppy disks. All units after the initial production have 32 megabytes of RAM, while the original production run only had 16 megabytes.

The 1541 Ultimate is capable of running both CP/M and GEOS.

In 2010, the 1541 Ultimate II was developed. The Ultimate II is about 30% smaller than the 1541 Ultimate, comes in a plastic case, and adds support for dual SIDs (plus a SID/MOD player), a USB host controller, tape emulation via a tape adapter (though use with a Commodore 128D requires modification), a real-time clock (for accurate file date and time), and the SD card slot is replaced by a microSD card slot. In addition, all firmware and VHDL code for the Ultimate II is available under an open source GPLv3 license, allowing hobbyists and others to freely modify all aspects of its functionality, including the FPGA-emulated hardware.

The 1541 Ultimate has an option for on-board Ethernet, while the 1541 Ultimate II supports Ethernet via a compatible USB to Ethernet adapter.

Besides being useful to retrocomputing hobbyists, it has also found use in educational laboratory settings.

In 2017 the Ultimate II+ was released with the following feature differentiation from the II:

Removal of the MicroSD slot, More USB ports, Integrated Ethernet, Dual Flash, Integrated Speaker, External power supply connector with auto-switch over circuit, Improved power supply circuits, and a slightly bigger and faster FPGA, as to control the new features.

The II and II+ share a firmware image and the software features are substantially similar.

== See also ==
- Commodore 1541
- Commodore 64 peripherals
- IDE64
