= PRGS =

PRGS may refer to:

- Frederick S. Pardee RAND Graduate School, an American higher education institution
- Progress Software Corporation, an American software company with Nasdaq index PRGS
- Phosphoribosylglycinamide formyltransferase, an enzyme
- Pokémon Ranger: Guardian Signs, a video game in the Pokémon series

== See also ==
- PRG (disambiguation)
