= Trilogic Expert Cartridge =

The Expert Cartridge from the UK company Trilogic was a popular extension cartridge which was introduced in mid-1986 for the Commodore 64 and a later Commodore 128 compatible version, It offered a fast loader, increasing the speeds of the disk drive, and a freezer, allowing the program execution to be stopped to be resumed later. Later Cat & Korsh International took over the distribution and the Trilogic name disappeared from the cartridge.

A major difference to the other two The Final Cartridge III and Action Replay is that it held its system software in an 8 kB RAM that could be reprogrammed. And thus allowed the user to change its functionality.

The author of the Expert Cartridge default firmware is John Twiddy who also programmed The Last Ninja for the Commodore 64. He claims that it saved him many months of programming.

== See also ==
- ISEPIC - An earlier cartridge with 2 kB RAM
- The Final Cartridge III
