= PRG =

PRG can mean:

- Parti radical de gauche (Radical Party of the Left), France
- Paul Roos Gymnasium, school in Stellenbosch, South Africa
- Post/Redirect/Get, in web applications
- prg, ISO 639-3 language code for the Old Prussian language
- Václav Havel Airport Prague, IATA code
- Programming Research Group, Oxford University 1965-2011
- Provisional Revolutionary Government of the Republic of South Vietnam, Viet Cong party
- People's Revolutionary Government (Grenada)
- Pseudorandom generator, of deterministic but pseudorandom numbers
- .prg is a file format used for Commodore 64 software
- Pontificale Romano-Germanicum, set of Latin documents of Catholic liturgical practice compiled in Saint Alban's Abbey, Mainz, in the 10th century.
