= CARDCO =

Computer peripheral company

- Founder: Ed Lippert II, Breck Ricketts
- Defunct: 1986
- Fate: Closed due to declining sales.
- Headquarters: Wichita, Kansas, US
- Products: computer peripherals

CARDCO was a computer peripheral company during the 1980s in Wichita, Kansas, United States. CARDCO was well known in the Commodore 64 and VIC-20 community because of advertisements in numerous issues of Compute! magazine and availability of their products at large retailers, such as Target.

== History ==
CARDCO was founded by Ed J. Lippert II (President / Management) and Breck Ricketts (Vice President / Engineering). It went out of business in 1986 because of the decline in sales of C64 computers.

In 1986, they formed a new company called C-Ltd that manufactured peripherals for Amiga computers, and it eventually went out of business in 1989 as the Amiga computer sales declined.

Computers Anonymous was a spin-off company ran by Cardco owners wife Betsy Lippert & Cherie Hovaidar-Safid, which repaired devices made and sold by CARDCO.

== Hardware products ==
=== Printer interfaces ===
There were severe shortcomings of early Commodore printers, so CARDCO created the Card Print A (C/?A) printer interface that emulated Commodore printers by converting the Commodore serial interface to a Centronics parallel printer interface to allow numerous 3rd-party printers to be connected to a Commodore 64 or VIC-20.

A second model, a version that supported printer graphics was released called the Card Print +G (C/?+G), supported printing Commodore graphic characters using Epson ESC/P escape codes.

CARDCO released additional enhancements, including a model with RS-232 serial output, and shipped over two million total printer interfaces.

Common compatible printers were manufactured by Epson, Panasonic, Okidata, Star Micronics, and C. Itoh.

GWIZ - Computer Interface between a Commodore 64 and a non Commodore printer such as a (Silver Reed Printer, Gorilla Printer, Etc.)

=== Cassette player interface ===
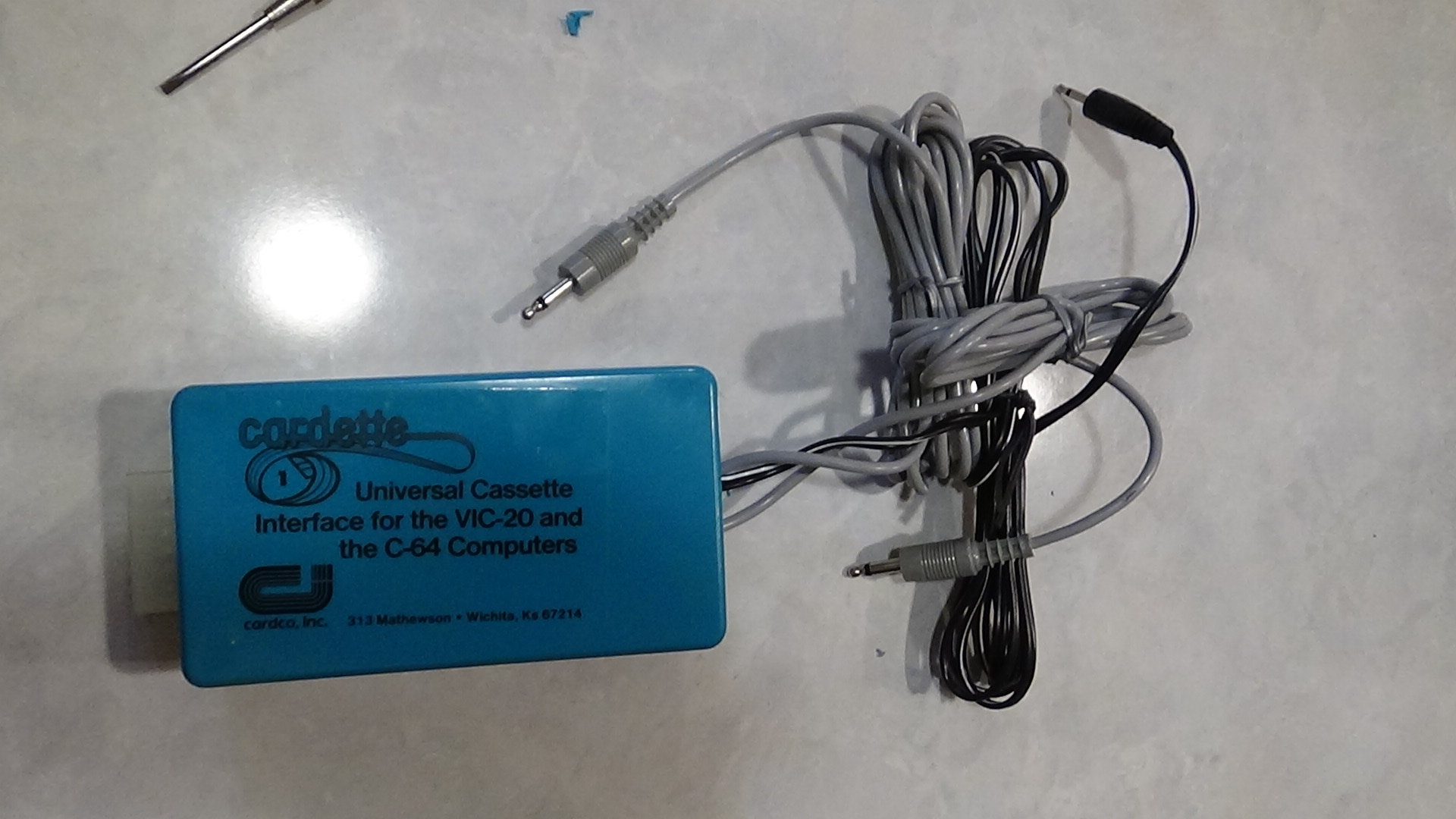
CARDCO Cardette Universal Cassette Interface

Unlike most other systems, Commodore computers could only use specialized cassette players, known as "Commodore Datasettes", to save data. CARDCO made an adaptor to work with normal cassette players.

=== Numpad ===
CARDCO made a numpad that plugged into both of the joystick ports on the Commodore 64.

== Software products ==
Cartridge

- Write Now (C/01) - word processor for VIC20.
- Write Now (C/02) - word processor for C64.
- Freeze Frame
- S'MORE

Floppy Disk

- Mail Now (D/01) - mailing list processor for C64.
- Spell Now (D/04) - spell checker for C64.
- File Now (D/05) - relational database for C64.
- Graph Now / Paint Now (D/06) - graph and chart generator for C64.
- Super Printer Utility Programs (D/08)

== See also ==
- Commodore 64 peripherals
- Commodore bus
- IEEE 1284
- Parallel port
- PETSCII
