= Lt. Kernal =

- Manufacturer: Fiscal Information, Inc. / Xetec
- Type: Hard disk
- Released: 1985
- Introductory price: US$969 (1987) (two years after release!) equivalent to $2,700 in 2025 USD
- Media: 5 1/4" Hard disk
- Storage: 10 MB ST-506 MFM (later up to 330 MB)
- Connectivity: ROM cartridge 44-pin expansion slot using an edge connector 38 kB/s (65 kB/s in C128 fast mode)
- Power: Typical 30 W, max 40 W.
- Backward compatibility: Commodore 64, Commodore 128

Lt. Kernal is a SASI hard drive subsystem developed for the 8-bit Commodore 64 and Commodore 128 home computers. The Lt. Kernal is capable of a data transfer rate of more than 38 kilobytes per second and 65 kilobytes per second in Commodore 128 fast mode.

== History ==
The original design of both the technically complicated hardware interface and disk operating system came from Lloyd Sponenburgh and Roy Southwick of Fiscal Information, Inc., a now-defunct Florida-based turnkey vendor of minicomputer-based medical information systems. Fiscal demonstrated a working prototype in 1984 and starting advertising the system for sale early in 1985. It immediately found a niche with some Commodore software developers and bulletin board sysops. It was released over the years in capacities of 10 megabytes to 330 megabytes. The subsequent development of a multiplexing accessory allows one Lt. Kernal to be shared by up to 16 computers, using a round robin scheduling algorithm. This makes the use of the Lt. Kernal with multiple line BBSs practical. Later, streaming tape support, using QIC-02 tape cartridges, was added to provide a premium backup strategy.

Fiscal built the units to order until late 1986, at which time the decision was made to turn over the production, marketing and customer support to Xetec Inc. Fiscal continued to provide secondary technical support, as well as free DOS upgrades, until December 1991, at which time production of new Lt. Kernal systems ceased. Following the shutdown of Xetec in 1995, private support of the Lt. Kernal was carried on for several years by Ron Fick until his untimely death in 1999.

== Overview ==
Lt. Kernal uses a 5 1/4" hard disk drive with a capacity of 10 MB and later up to 330 MB. The hard drive uses MFM to encode data and an ST-506 interface to the OMTI 5300 intelligent SASI controller. This controller board presents a SASI (SCSI) externally that is connected via a cable with DB-25 connectors in both ends. That is plugged into the host adapter that handles the SASI signals and protocol with a controller that plugs directly into the 44-pin ROM cartridge expansion slot in the form of a physical edge connector that mates the controller board to the system bus of the host computer.

The connection between the computer host adapter (DB-25F) and the hard drive unit consists of a cable with two DB-25 connectors.

A key feature of the Lt. Kernal is its sophisticated disk operating system, which behaves much like that of the Point 4 minicomputers that Fiscal was reselling in the 1980s. A high degree of control over the Lt. Kernal is possible with simple typed commands, many of which had never been seen before in the 8-bit Commodore environment. It features a keyed random access filing system.

== Reception ==
The Lt. Kernal was favorably and comprehensively reviewed in The Transactor, which praised the drive's speed, storage capacity, and ease of use. Some criticism was levied at the product's incomplete documentation, its drain on the resources of the host computer (particularly with the Commodore 64, whose limited memory requires frequent paging of the DOS), and the lack of an automated backup utility. The review noted the drive's particular suitability for professional programmers, business users, and BBS sysops.

== See also ==
- Commodore with IEEE-488
- Commodore bus
