= Gamma Strike =

- Developer(s): Simon Phillips; Stephen Kay
- Publisher(s): Gamesware
- Composer(s): Dale Edgar (Goosesoft)
- Platform(s): Amstrad CPC, Commodore 64, ZX Spectrum
- Release: 1988

Gamma Strike is a set of games originally written for the Commodore 64 and released by Gamesware in 1988. The bundle included three games (Competition Shootout, Voyager 19, and Alien Team) together with a gun and target peripheral.

== Reception ==
ACE magazine described it as a "novel product aimed at the younger player, who'll probably get quite a bit of satisfaction from it".
