= RAM image =

A RAM image is a sequence of machine code instructions and associated data kept permanently in the non-volatile ROM memory of an embedded system, which is copied into volatile RAM by a bootstrap loader. Typically the RAM image is loaded into RAM when the system is switched on, and it contains a second-level bootstrap loader and basic hardware drivers, enabling the unit to function as desired, or else more sophisticated software to be loaded into the system.
