= Xetec =

American software company

Xetec, Inc.
- Type: Corporation
- Industry: Personal computer, computer engineering
- Founded: Salina, Kansas, U.S. (1983)
- Founder: Jon Flickinger
- Defunct: 1995
- Fate: Discontinued
- Headquarters: Salina, Kansas, U.S.
- Number of locations: 1
- Area served: Global
- Products: Lt. Kernal

Xetec /ˈziːtɛk/ was founded in 1983 by Jon Flickinger, and was located in Salina, Kansas, United States. Before closing in 1995, the company produced many third-party products for the Commodore 64, Commodore 128, Amiga, Macintosh, Atari ST and PC computers.

== Overview ==
The Lt. Kernal is the first third-party hard drive peripheral for Commodore computers. Originally developed by Fiscal Information in 1985, it was turned over to Xetec for manufacturing and customer support.

Xetec's best selling product is its line of printer interfaces, which allows the use of many models of non-Commodore parallel-interface printers with Commodore computers. Some of the popular printers of that era that are supported include Canon, C-Itoh, Star Micronics, Epson, NEC, Okidata, and Panasonic. Early interface models (such as the "Serial Printer Interface" and "Graphics Printer Interface") simply convert from Commodore's serial format to the more standard Centronics parallel interface, with only minimal ASCII conversions and graphic character printing. The Super Graphix Jr adds support for 50+ printers and "Near Letter Quality", which is a technique of using multi-pass graphic printing to achieve higher quality text printing. The more sophisticated Super Graphix also adds an 8K data buffer, screen dump support, two user-loadable fonts (from a library of fonts on the included disk), and a font creation program. The Super Graphix Gold adds a 32K buffer, 4 fixed and 4 user-loadable fonts (from a library of fonts on disk), 10 font printing effects, picture printing, built-in screen dump programs, fast-serial support, and the rather unusual ability to interface a printer directly to a disk drive (for printing pictures and loading fonts directly from disk).

The Fontmaster line of word processing software provides Commodore users the ability to exploit the graphics capabilities just emerging in printers of the day in order to produce documents containing a mixture of font styles, sizes and effects as well as embedded pictures. Although lacking the power and flexibility of word processors available today, it was ground-breaking in its day, winning an Outstanding Original Programming award at the 1985 Consumer Electronics Show. Fontmaster 128 was featured in the 1987 Consumer Electronics Show Software Showcase.

Xetec's offerings for the Amiga include SCSI interfaces, hard drives, CD-ROM drives, streaming tape drives, and RAM expansion. Xetec was the first to offer the popular Fish disks collection on CD-ROM with their three-volume set of Fish & More discs.

Xetec also developed a few products for Macintosh and PC computers, products for the RC hobby market, and spent a number of years in research and development of solid-state fluorescent lighting ballasts, for which Jon Flickinger holds two patents.

In summary, Xetec's total list of products include these: Lt. Kernal, Serial Printer Interface, Graphics Printer Interface, Super Graphix, Super Graphix Jr, Super Graphix Gold, Graphix AT, Fontmaster, Fontmaster II, Fontmaster 128, Printer Enhancer, FastTape, FastTrak, FastCard, FastCard Plus, MiniFastCard, FastRAM, Fish & More (vols. I, II, III), CDx CD-ROM Filesystem, CDx 650, Beeping Tomm, SuperWriter 924, SCAD.

== Reception ==
Compute!'s Gazette in 1986 called the $49.95 Fontmaster II "a terrific value, and well worth the trouble of learning some new commands in exchange for the excellent printouts it delivers".
