= Triton Quick Disk Drive =

Floppy disk drive

The Triton Quick Disk Drive is a product that allows 2.8-inch floppy disks to be read on the Commodore 64, ZX Spectrum, MSX, Mattel Aquarius and Dragon 64 home computers. The product was released for sale in the mid-1980s.

The disk drive can be used with Hitachi Maxell 2.8-inch double sided floppy disks, with a capacity of 144 kilobytes non-formatted and 100 kilobytes formatted. Each side has 20 sectors of 2.5 kB written in a spiral pattern instead of the more usual circular tracks. A maximum of 20 files can be saved on each side of the floppy disk.

The data transfer rate is up to 100 kilobits per second. The disk drive measures 250 × 225 × 65 mm, weighing in at 3.2 kilograms.

== Triton and Commodore 64 ==
For use on the Commodore 64, the controller/interface box contains an EPROM with an additional operating system, C-64 T-DOS, that when connected to the computer through the memory expansion port can be called by typing "SYS 32768". This activated various new commands;

- @Dn
- @Format
- @Dir
- @Save
- @ASave
- @Write
- @Load
- @Run
- @Aload
- @Kill
- @Quit
- @ACopy
- @CassCopy

If something goes wrong, 14 different error messages will give indications about what may have happened.

== Triton and Spectrum ==
For use on the Spectrum computer, the controller/interface box contains an EPROM with an additional operating system, Spectrum T-DOS, adding various new commands to the computer:

- Format *n
- Cat *n
- Save *n;b;'file name'
- Save *n;m;'file name; startadd; endadd
- Load *n; 'file name'
- Erase *n; 'file name'
- Copy *n1 to n2; 'file name'
- Copy

These commands can be used in BASIC programs, as long as the controller is connected. If something goes wrong, 11 different error messages will give indications about what may have happened.
