= Lucky Logic =

Lucky Logic is a programming tool for the Fischertechnik computing models. It uses a graphical programming language.

The first version was released in 1991 for MS-DOS, Atari ST, and Amiga in the course of the modular computing professional.
