= ISEPIC =

Utility cartridge for the Commodore 64

The ISEPIC (pronounced like "ice-pick") from Starpoint Software in USA is an extension cartridge introduced in June 1985 for the Commodore 64. It offers the capability to memory dump software regardless of the implementation scheme or storage medium. The resulting snapshot can be tested before saving.

Snapshots require ISEPIC to run, but can be modified to create standalone versions that do not need the cartridge. A major factor is the 2 KB RAM that can be reprogrammed, and thus allows the user to change its functionality. The 2 KB RAM is memory banked into a 256-byte page at 0xDF00 – 0xDFFF.

== Reception ==
ISEPIC creator Chip Gracey said that he sold 20,000 cartridges within one year, mostly through computer clubs and magazines.

Ahoy! in October 1985 stated that "the ramifications of [ISEPIC] are startling, to say the least". While warning readers against violating copyright, the magazine discussed the cartridge's ability to both produce snapshots that require the cartridge to boot, and help users modify snapshots to produce standalone versions of programs ("In the tradition of the true hacker, these routines also display the ISEPIC logo while booting the program"). The magazine stated in March 1986 that "While ISEPIC did not do bad as a forerunner, it does not measure up to" Snapshot 64/Clonebuster or Capture; neither requires booting from disk to use, and both produce standalone snapshots.

== See also ==
- Trilogic Expert Cartridge - A later cartridge with 8 kB RAM
