= IDE64 =

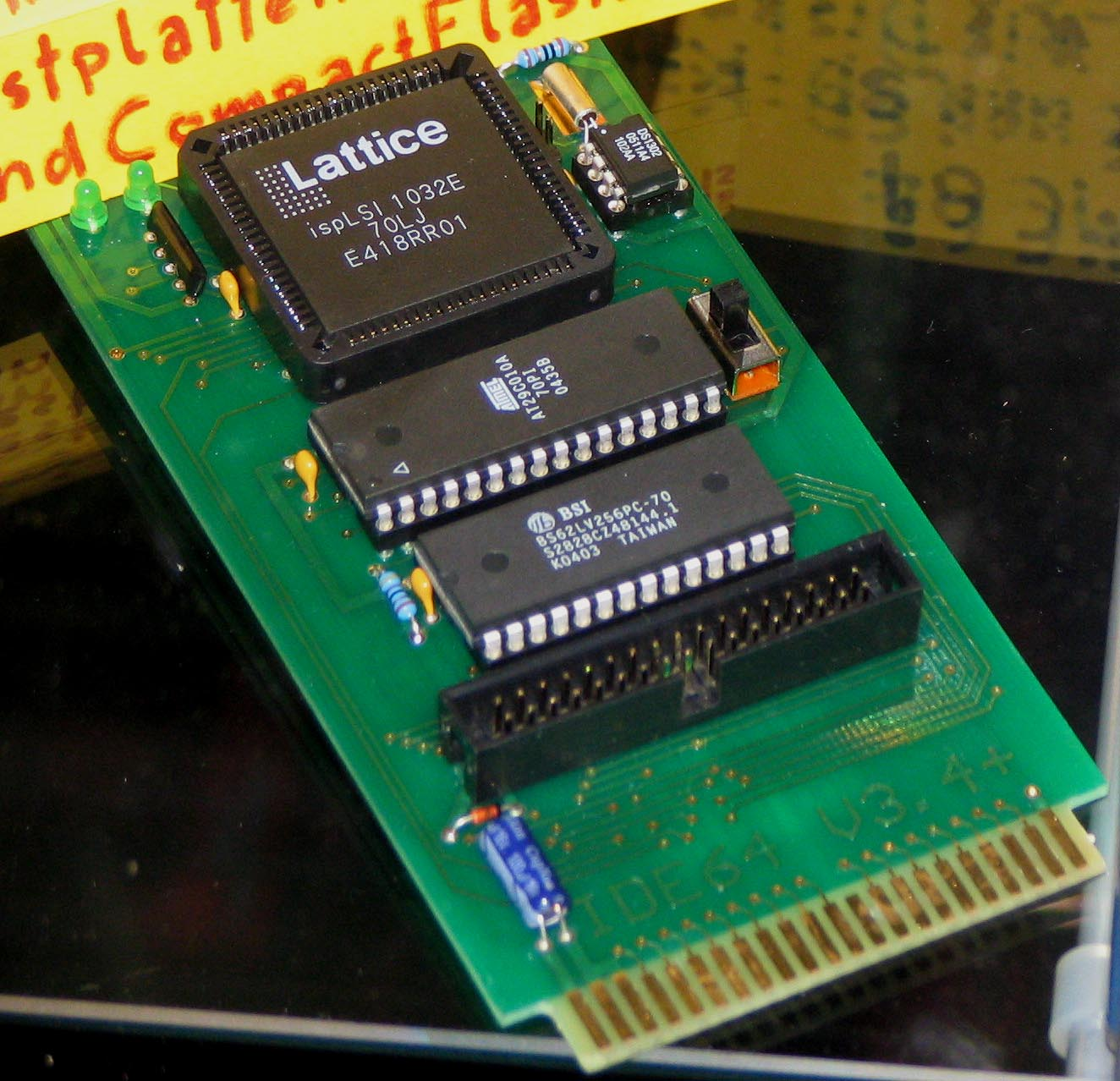
Expansion card for IDE drives, CD-ROMs and Flash EEPROM modules for the C64

The IDE64 interface cartridge is an expansion port device for connecting ATA(PI) devices to the C64 or C128 computers.

== Hardware ==
There were several different versions of this cartridge over the years. The interface was designed by Tomas Pribyl and Jan Vorlicek in 1994. As of 2023 Josef Soucek was the maintainer of the design (involved in the project at least since 2006).

- IDE64 v1.1 – In 1997 the first public version of the cartridge appeared. The logic was fitted into 2 ispLSIs, the operating system was burned into a 32 kB EPROM, and there was 16 kB of RAM storage for buffers. There was a DS1302 real-time clock included which could keep the settings and hold the time backed by a battery. Beside the parallel ATA connector also an expansion port pass through was included to allow attaching of other cartridges.
- IDE64 v2.1 – Around 1999 the first "modern" version of the cartridge came out, merging the logic into one big ispLSI PLD. Also the EPROM was upgraded to a 64 kB EEPROM to allow operating system upgrades without special equipment. The RAM was extended to hold 28 kB of buffers and internal variables. There was a new connector on board, called ShortBus. It was meant for hardware expansions like LCD, 7-segment display, but later also more sophisticated expansions appeared. This was also the first version to include SuperCPU compatibility.
- IDE64 v3.1 –In 2001 a redesigned version of the 2.1 cartridge was made, this version drops the expansion port pass-through.
- IDE64 v3.4 –CompactFlash cards became popular, so the cartridge was redesigned in 2004 to include a CF socket. This allowed a mobile and small storage possibility for the C64, without additional devices and power supplies.
- IDE64 v3.4+ – In 2005, with a small hardware change, the EEPROM was upgraded to 128 kB, which allowed to hold two versions of the operating system for both a standard C64 and SuperCPU. This was selectable with a small switch, and solved the reflashing problem for those with SuperCPU equipped systems.
- IDE64 v4.1 – The pre-release happened in 2008 August, but it was not available until 2009 March. The hardware was redesigned to use surface-mounted parts and a more up-to-date ispMACH CPLD, which resulted in a much shorter board. A USB serial FIFO chip was added for fast PCLink connections, and an Amiga clock-port for connecting additional devices. The card slot on this version is separated from the parallel ATA port, and offers wider compatibility with CF cards. The I/O interface was changed to support 128 kB operating system and was tweaked for slightly faster data transfer speeds.

== ShortBus expansions ==
- ETH64 – A LAN91C96 chip based Ethernet card. It is supported by Contiki, Wings and maybe some other software. It can also be used for PCLink connection.
- DUART – This is a XR68C681 based dual RS-232 card featuring, mostly used for PCLink connection. It is supported by Contiki, Wings, Novaterm 9.6 and maybe some other software.
- DigiMAX – It is a MAX506 based 4 channel 8-bit digital-to-analog converter card, can be used as "sound card", as the output comes out on two jack plugs. This card is supported by Modplay, Wings and maybe some other programs.
- ETFE – This is a CS8900 based Ethernet card, just like the popular RR-Net, but the v1.1 version works only in TFE compatible mode. It can be used for PCLink, has a Contiki driver, and work with software designed for the original TFE card. For the next version (v1.2) a jumper is promised to simulate a RR-Net card.
