= Commodore 64 software =

Software for the 1982 home computer

The Commodore 64 amassed a large software library of nearly 10,000 commercial titles, covering genres from games to business applications.

== Applications, utility, and business software ==
The Commodore 64’s slow 1541 disk drive limited its suitability as a business computer, yet it was used for tasks like graphics creation, desktop publishing, and word processing. Info 64, the first magazine produced using desktop publishing tools, was created on and dedicated to the Commodore platform.

Popular graphics software included KoalaPainter, known for its graphics tablet interface, and Doodle!, a widely used drawing program. Desktop publishing tools like The Print Shop and "The Newsroom" enabled users to create signs, banners, and newsletters. Light pens and CAD software were also available.

Multiplan - spreadsheet program developed by Microsoft

Word processors such as PaperClip and Vizawrite were popular, alongside the type-in program SpeedScript, published in Compute!'s Gazette. Spreadsheet programs included Multiplan by Microsoft and Calc Result, while Vizastar offered integrated software features. Office suites like Mini Office II and software from Data Becker were also available.

The GEOS operating system provided a graphical interface akin to the early Apple Macintosh, with office applications and support for peripherals like printers and light pens. It gained popularity for its affordability and capabilities.

Music software included Music Construction Set and MIDI cartridges, with the modern Prophet64 cartridge offering advanced sequencing and synthesis.

== Games ==
Think back for a minute to the first program you ever saw on a Commodore 64. Chances are it was a game, if you've had a 64 for more than a couple of years.

— Compute!'s Gazette, 1986

Ghostbusters by Activision, 1984.

By 1985, games comprised 60–70% of Commodore 64 software, driven by its advanced sound and graphics hardware. Over 23,000 unique game titles were released.

Winter Games: the "Hot Dog" event.

Notable titles included International Soccer, Impossible Mission, and Epyx’s multievent series (Summer Games, Winter Games, World Games, and California Games). Other significant games were Boulder Dash, The Sentinel, and Elite. Budget games from Mastertronic and Codemasters were popular on cassette. In 1993, Mayhem in Monsterland earned a 100% rating from Commodore Format for its graphics and gameplay.

== Type-ins, bulletin boards, and disk magazines ==
Cover of Loadstar #53 (1988)

The Commodore 64 featured a large library of type-in programs published in magazines like Compute!'s Gazette, Ahoy!, and RUN. Disk magazines like Loadstar provided ready-to-run programs. BBSs distributed public domain and freeware software via services like Q-Link and CompuServe.

== Software cracking ==
Software piracy was prevalent, with warez groups like FairLight distributing cracked software via BBSs and sneakernets. Tools like Fast Hack'em bypassed copy protection.

== BASIC ==
The Commodore 64 shipped with BASIC 2.0, limited in accessing advanced features, requiring PEEK and POKE or extensions like Simons' BASIC. Commodore opted for BASIC 2.0 to reduce costs.

== Music ==
The SID chip enabled music software like Kawasaki Synthesizer and Music Construction Set. Modern tools include GoatTracker.

== Development tools ==
Development tools included assemblers like MIKRO and compilers for C and Pascal. Game creation kits like SEUCK and GameMaker were popular.

== Modern-day development tools ==
Current tools include CBM prg Studio, Relaunch64, and assemblers like Kick Assembler and cc65.

== Retrocomputing efforts ==
Preservation efforts involve transferring software to modern media and developing emulators like VICE. The GameBase 64 project catalogs nearly 29,000 titles.
