= Creative Micro Designs =

Creative Micro Designs, Inc.
- Type: Private
- Industry: Computer
- Founded: 1985; 41 years ago
- Founder: Mark Fellows
- Defunct: 2009; 17 years ago
- Fate: Dissolution
- Successor: Retro Innovations

Creative Micro Designs, Inc. (CMD) was founded in 1987 by Doug Cotton and Mark Fellows. It is a computer technology company which originally developed and sold products for the Commodore 64 and C128 8-bit personal computers. After 2001 it sold IBM PC compatibles and related equipment.

== History ==
CMD's first product, JiffyDOS, was developed from 1985 onwards by Mark Fellows. An updated disk operating system, it maintained broad compatibility with Commodore floppy drives' DOS while offering much increased read-write access.

CMD stopped selling Commodore products in 2001. In July of that year, programmer Maurice Randal was sold an exclusive license to produce and sell the Commodore-related products. His company Click Here Software Co supplied the products until around 2009.

In 2010, Jim Brain acquired the license to supply JiffyDOS. Since January of that year, he has sold the product via his webshop Retro Innovations.

== Products ==
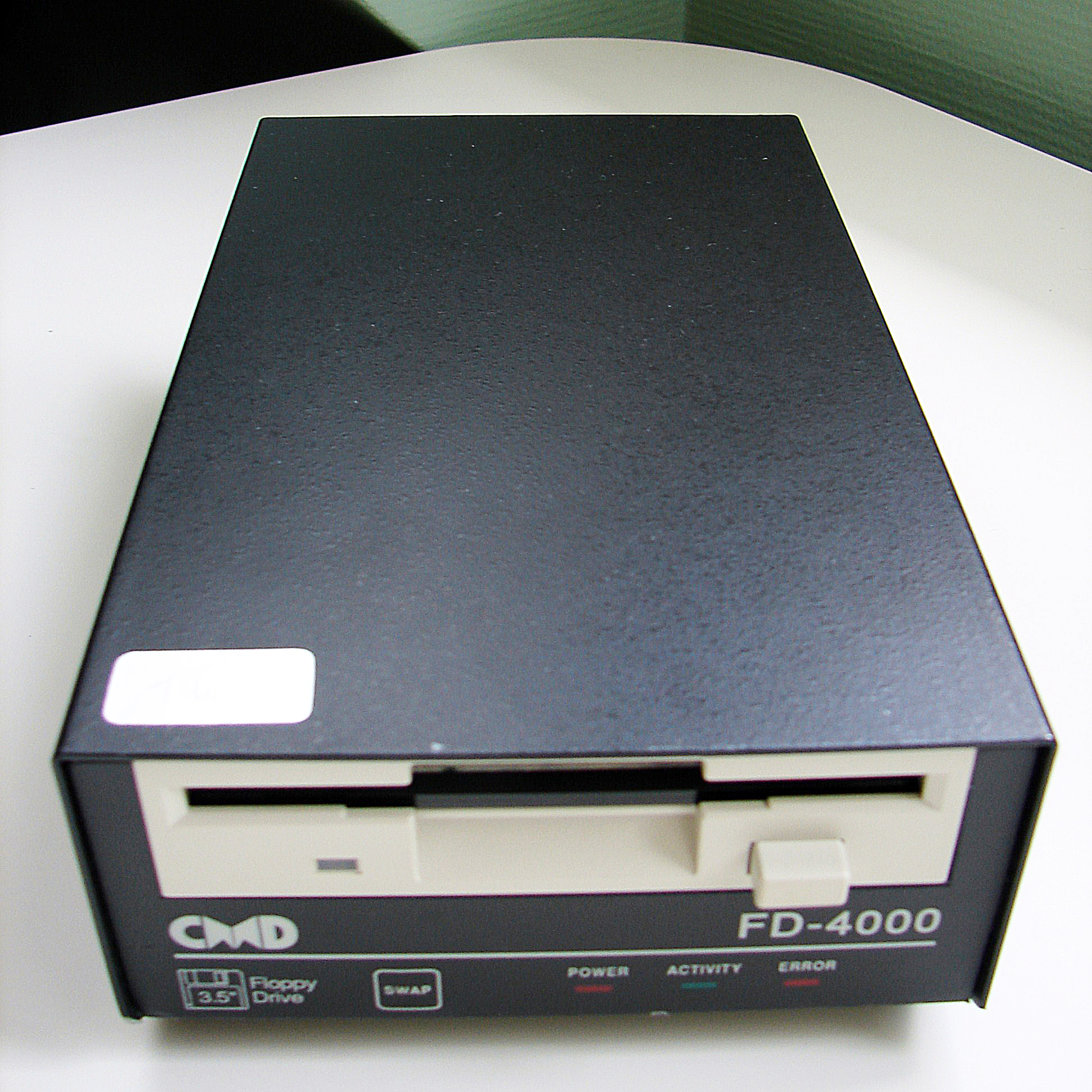
CMD FD-4000 disk drive

- SuperCPU - A 65816 CPU 8/16-bit upgrade for the C64 and C128 released on May 4, 1997, with version 2, the C128-compatible version, being launched in 1998.
- RAMLink - A 'fast' solid-state RAM-Disk that would plug into the cartridge port of the C64 or C128 which added between 1 MB and 16 MB. The C64 version typically required a 'timer jump clip'. The RAMPort allowed it to work with the Commodore 17xx RAM Expansion Units
- FD series - The FD2000 used 'High Density' Disks of up to 1.6 MB of storage, with the FD4000 using 'Enhanced Density' Disks of up to 3.2 MB of storage
- HD series - SCSI Hard drives of between 20 MB and 4.4 GB using CMD's native partitioning system of 16 MB per partition
- JiffyDOS - Adds DOS Wedge commands for easier functionality via BASIC command prompt
- SwiftLink/Turbo232 - Adds dial-up modems to your Commodore 64 or 128 of up to 38.4 kbit/s (SwiftLink) or 56.6 kbit/s (Turbo232)
- 1750 XL - a Commodore 17xx REU clone in two flavours adding either 512 KB or 2 MB
- SuperRAMCard - Works in conjunction with the SuperCPU to add between 1 MB and 16 MB of directly accessible memory using the 65816 processor
- SmartTRACK/SmartMOUSE - An 'intelligent' Commodore 1351 3-buttoned mouse or trackball which had 2K of RAM and a battery-backed Y2K compliant real time clock which was GEOS-compatible
