= SuperCPU =

Processor upgrade for the Commodore 64

The SuperCPU is a processor upgrade for the Commodore 64 and Commodore 128 personal computer platforms. It uses the W65C816S 8/16 bit microprocessor, and takes the form of an expansion port cartridge, rather than a replacement for the 6510 CPU.

== History ==
The SuperCPU was developed by Creative Micro Designs, Inc and released on May 4, 1997. It used a device called the RamCard to increase its capabilities. The card is no longer sold by Creative Micro Designs as of 2001; the distribution was taken over from 2001 to 2009 by the U.S. company Click Here Software Co., but it is unclear if any were manufactured after 2001.

== Technical description ==
The SuperCPU can have up to 16 MB RAM installed and sported a "Turbo" switch which when enabled, clocked a Commodore 64 or Commodore 128 up to 20 MHz. The SuperCPU requires 0.4 A (400mA) and has a shadow ROM in 128 KB of RAM. Internal ROM was 128 KB. Using the RamCard's fast page mode 1, 4, 8 or 16 MB SIMM memory modules can be used.
