= P500 =

P500 or similar may refer to:

- P-500 Bazalt, a cruise missile used by the Soviet and Russian navies
- P-500 Clavinova, a Yamaha portable digital piano
- Philippine five hundred-peso note
- Commodore P500, a computer in the Commodore CBM-II series
- LG Optimus One P500, a smartphone
- Nikon Coolpix P500, a digital camera in the Nikon Coolpix Performance Series
- Quadro P500, an Nvidia graphics card
- ThinkStation P500, a Lenovo computer workstation
- Toshiba Satellite P500, various laptops in the Toshiba Satellite P series

== See also ==
- P400 (disambiguation)
- P600 (disambiguation)
- Topographic prominence, often abbreviated as P followed by a number of metres
