= MSD Super Disk =

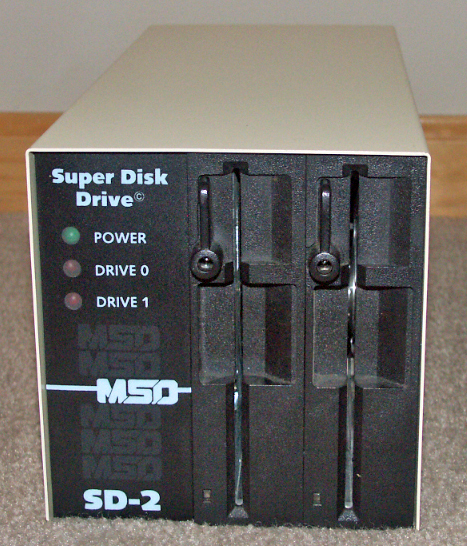
- The MSD SD-2 dual floppy disk drive
- Manufacturer: Micro Systems Development
- Type: Floppy disk drive
- Introductory price: $695 (SD-2)
- Media: 5¼" floppy disk SS SD
- Operating system: MSD DOS, partially CBM DOS 2.6 compatible.
- CPU: Rockwell International 6511Q microcontroller @ 1 MHz
- Memory: 6 kB SRAM (3x 2016), 16kB EPROM (2x 2764)
- Storage: 170 kB per disk – TEC brand (model FB-501)
- Connectivity: Parallel IEEE-488, Commodore serial IEEE-488 bus (IEC Bus)
- Backward compatibility: Commodore 64, C128 Commodore PET/CBM, 4000-series, 8000-series, B128
- Related: Commodore 1541 & 4040

The MSD Super Disk were a series of 5¼-inch floppy disk drives compatible to some degree with the Commodore 1541 disk drive, produced by Micro Systems Development (Dallas, Texas; later MSD Systems) for use with Commodore 8-bit home computers. Two different versions of the MSD Super Disk were available: the single-drive model, SD-1; and the dual-drive model, SD-2.

== Introduction ==
Introduced in 1983, the MSD Super Disk drives were the first third-party devices designed for compatibility with the Commodore 64, although other manufacturers soon followed suit. The MSD drives include both an IEEE-488 parallel interface and the custom Commodore serial interface. Therefore, they can be connected to any Commodore 8-bit system, from the Commodore PET to the C64 and C128, without any converters or other add-on devices.

== Features and pricing ==
The MSD SD-1 was more expensive than the Commodore 1541. For instance, a typical mail-order advertisement in the January 1985 issue of RUN Magazine lists the MSD SD-1 single drive at $249.95, compared to $199.95 for the Commodore 1541. The SD-2 was listed at $449.95, much less than the comparable Commodore PET dual drive (CBM 4040) which sold for $699. To justify the typically $50 or so (equivalent to $150 in 2025) higher price of the MSD SD-1 single drive over the Commodore 1541, MSD claimed to offer several advantages over the 1541.

In an August 1985 review of 1541 replacements, RUN Magazine wrote that the MSD SD-2 was "built like a tank and can run 24 hours a day for weeks". And while program loading and saving was no faster than on the 1541 when using the serial interface due to that interface's limitations, both the SD-1 and SD-2 were several times faster when connected to the computer via the IEEE-488 interface. MSD Systems also offered the VIE and CIE IEEE-488 interface for the VIC-20 and Commodore 64, respectively. Furthermore, a blank disk could be formatted in only 18 seconds on the MSD Super Disk series, compared to 1 minute and 22 seconds on the 1541.

The MSD SD-2 implements the Commodore DOS Duplicate command from the older Commodore PET dual drive series. Because the SD-2 has paired drive units and 6kB of internal RAM, it allows entire disks to be copied in less than 2 minutes. It is still unable to read and write an entire track of data (over 7kB) in a single rotation of the media, which would be optimal. It does have an empty PCB pad available to add a 4th 2kB chip. A third-party hardware & software add-on (Chip Level Designs' Mass Duplicator) was produced to add the extra RAM and allow for full-track-per-rotation 22-second disk duplication.

The Commodore BASIC V4.0 COPY command can also be used to copy files from one drive to another on the MSD SD-2, a feature not available with two 1541 drives. However, the MSD Super Disk drives have difficulty loading most copy-protected software, due to substantial differences in the DOS code, memory mapping and the microcontroller used.

Internally, both models feature TEC brand (model FB-501) floppy drive mechanisms. The electronics on the mechanisms are modified by MSD to be compatible with the GCR recording format used by all Commodore floppy disk drives at that time (the D9060/90 hard disks and the later produced 1581 3½-inch drive used the MFM recording format). The main control board utilizes a 1 MHz Rockwell International 6511Q microcontroller.

== Reception ==
Ahoy! noted the SD-2's incompatibilities with some 1541 software, but concluded that "serious users of the Commodore 64 will easily be able to justify the $695 price tag. The time savings alone, when backing up disk files, will rapidly pay for the machine", and also a good replacement for the CBM 4040.
