= Commodore 2031 =

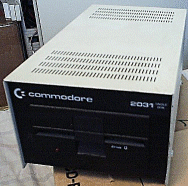
- Commodore 2031 disk drive
- Manufacturer: Commodore Business Machines, Inc.
- Type: Floppy disk drive
- Media: 5¼" floppy disk SS SD
- Operating system: CBM DOS 2.6
- CPU: MOS 6502 @ 1 MHz
- Memory: High profile model: 2 KB SRAM (4x 2114), 16 KB ROM (2x 2364) Low profile model: 2 KB SRAM (2016), 16 KB ROM (2x 2364)
- Storage: 170 KB per disk
- Connectivity: Parallel IEEE-488
- Backward compatibility: Commodore PET/CBM, 4000-series, 8000-series, B128
- Related: Commodore 2040 & 4040

The Commodore 2031 and Commodore 4031 are single-unit 5¼" floppy disk drives for Commodore International computers. They use a similar steel case form to the Commodore 9060/9090 hard disk drives, and use the parallel IEEE-488 interface common to Commodore PET/CBM computers. Essentially, both models are a single-drive version of the Commodore 2040/4040 units.

The Commodore 2031LP is functionally the same as the 2031, but used the lower-profile tan case of the second version of the Commodore 1540 floppy disk drive intended for home computer use.

These drive models use a single-density, single-side floppy data storage format similar to that used by the Commodore 1540 & Commodore 1541 drives, but with a slightly different data marker indicating which model originally formatted the disk. The low-level disk format is similar enough to allow reading between models, but different enough that one series of drive models cannot reliably write to disks formatted with one of the other model series. A difference of one extra 'header' byte is what causes this write incompatibility.
