= Toshiba Satellite S series =

Series of laptops by Toshiba

Satellite S series

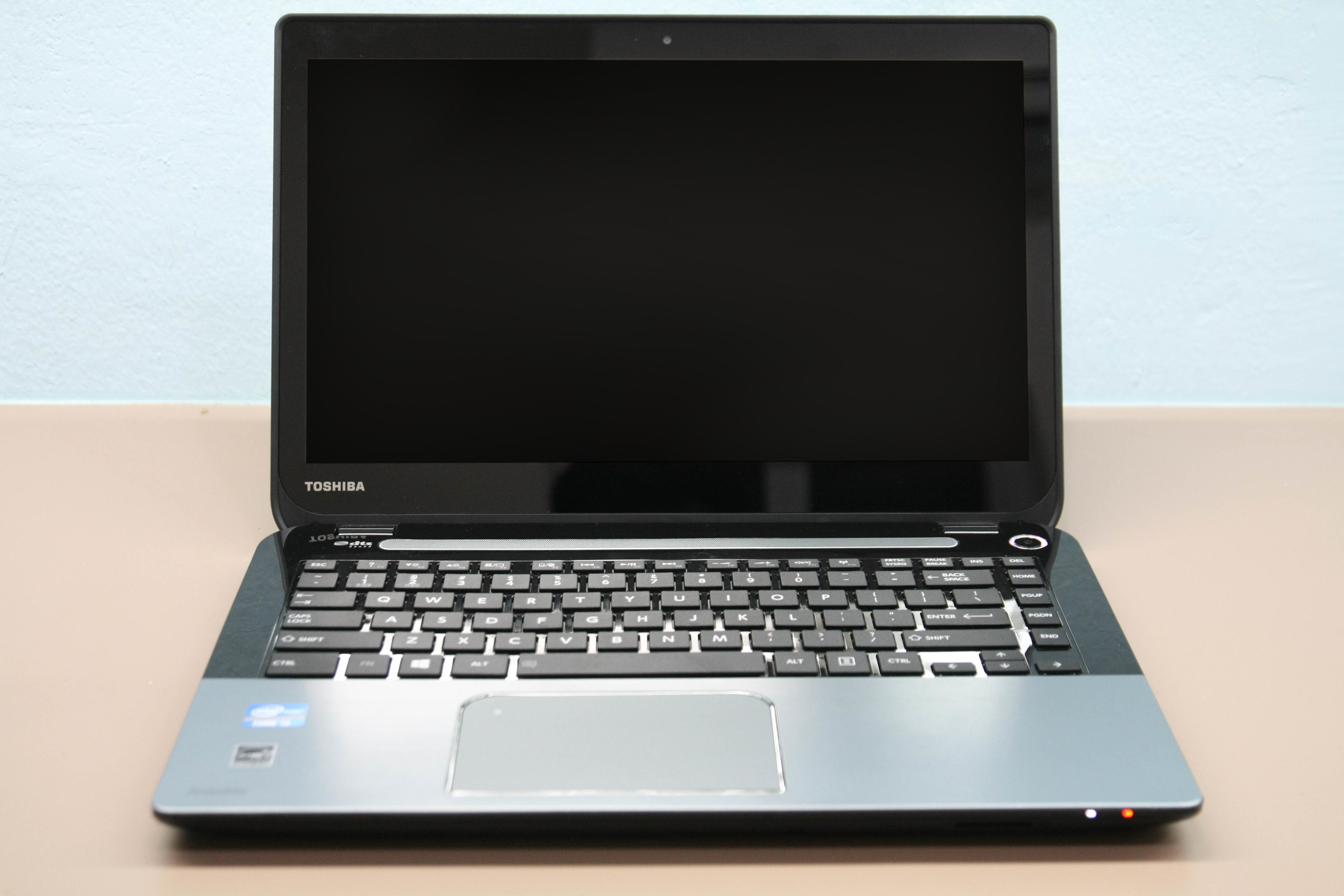
- Satellite S40t
- Developer: Toshiba Information Systems Corporation (2012–2016)
- Type: Consumer laptop

The Satellite S series was Toshiba Information Systems' midrange line of Satellite laptops. It was introduced in 2012, positioned above their mainstream L series but below the premium P range. Features included Nvidia GeForce graphics processing units, Harman Kardon speakers, optional touchscreen displays, and optional backlit keyboards; it was the lowest-priced entry of the Satellite family to offer discrete graphics. Displays ranged from 14 to 17.3-inches diagonally in size, with only displays 15.6-inches diagonally or larger affording the option for full 1080p resolution initially—14-in panels were limited to 1366 × 768. The series was refreshed in 2015 to add a 4K panel option and raise the minimum screen size to 15.6-inches diagonally. The first models of the S series included an optical drive bay, with an option for a Blu-ray drive. The bay was removed in a 2014 refresh to make the laptop slimmer but restored in the 2015 refresh.

On its introduction, technology journalists wrote that the S series almost reached ultrabook status in terms of performance and features but fell short due to its heft. The first entries weighed a little over 5 pounds (2.3 kg); later entries reached the under-5-lb mark.

Toshiba discontinued the S series in 2016 along with the entire Satellite line of laptops.

== Models ==
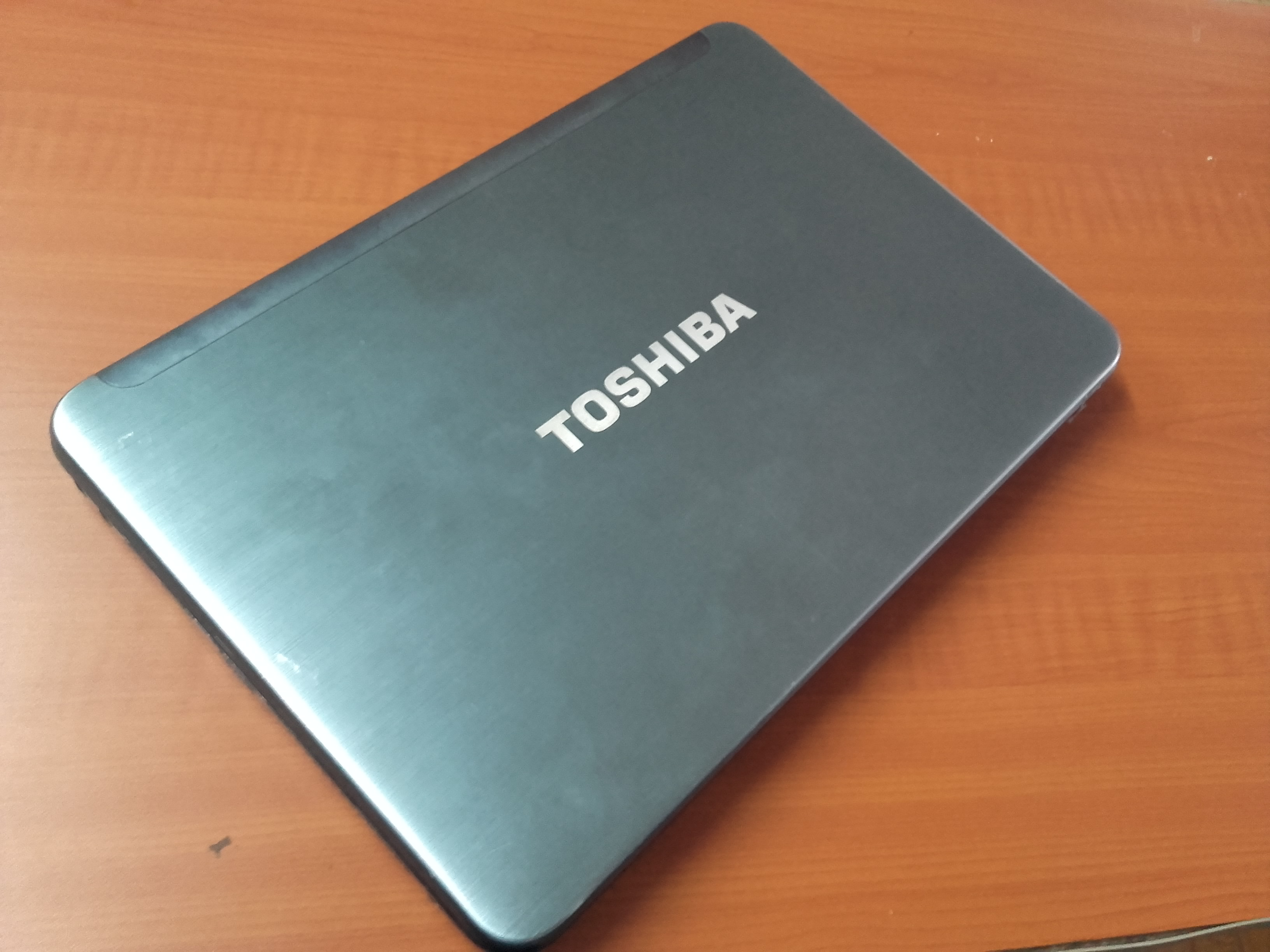
A Satellite S series laptop with its lid closed

Toshiba Satellite models
Model no.	Display	Processor	Chipset	Clock speed (GHz)	Graphics	RAM	Storage	Networking	Audio	Operating system	Reference
S45-A4111SL	14.0" TFT TruBrite @ 1366 x 768 (HD)	Intel Core i5-4200U with Intel Turbo Boost Technology 2.0		2.60	NVIDIA GeForce GT 740M	8 GB DDR3L @ 1600 MHz (max. 16 GB)	1 TB (5400 RPM) Serial ATA HDD	Ethernet 10/100/1000; Wi-Fi Wireless (802.11b/g/n); Bluetooth V4.0	Built-in stereo speakers with DTS Studio Sound	Windows 8.1	S45-A4111SL
S50-ABT2N22		Intel Core i3-3227U	Mobile Intel HM76 Express	1.90	Mobile Intel HD Graphics	4 GB DDR3 @ 1600 MHz	500 GB (5400 RPM) Serial ATA HDD	Ethernet 10/100/1000; Wi-Fi Wireless (802.11b/g/n); Bluetooth V4.0	Built-in harman/kardonstereo speakers with DTS Studio Sound	Windows 8.1	S50-ABT2N22
S50-AST2NX1		Intel Core i5-3337U with Intel Turbo Boost Technology 2.0	Mobile Intel HM76 Express	2.70	Mobile Intel HD Graphics	12 GB DDR3 @ 1600 MHz (max 16 GB)	1 TB (5400 RPM) Serial ATA HDD	Ethernet 10/100/1000; Wi-Fi Wireless (802.11b/g/n); Bluetooth V4.0	Built-in harman/kardonstereo speakers with DTS Studio Sound	Windows 8	S50-AST2NX1
S50-BST2NX1		Intel Core i5-4210U with Intel Turbo Boost Technology 2.0		2.70	Mobile Intel HD Graphics	12 GB DDR3L @ 1600 MHz (max 16 GB)	1 TB (5400 RPM) Serial ATA HDD		Built-in harman/kardon stereo speakers with DTS Sound	Windows 8.1	S50-BST2NX1
S50-BST2NX4		Intel Core i5-4210U with Intel Turbo Boost Technology 2.0		2.70	Mobile Intel HD Graphics	12 GB DDR3L @ 1600 MHz (max 16 GB)	1 TB (5400 RPM) Serial ATA HDD		Built-in harman/kardon stereo speakers with DTS Sound	Windows 8.1	S50-BST2NX4
S50-CBT2N22		Intel Core i7-5500U with Intel Turbo Boost Technology 2.0		3.00		4 GB DDR3 @ 1600 MHz	500 GB (5400 RPM) Serial ATA HDD		Built-in harman/kardon stereo speakers with DTS Sound	Windows 10 Home	S50-CBT2N22
S50T-CST3GX2		Intel Core i7-6500U with Intel Turbo Boost Technology 2.0		3.10	NVIDIA GeForce GTX 950M	16 GB DDR3L	256 GB M.2 SSD (Slot 1); 2TB 5400 RPM HDD (Slot 2)		Built-in harman/kardon stereo speakers with DTS Sound	Windows 10 Home	S50T-CST3GX2
S55-A5167		Intel Core i7-4700MQ with Intel Turbo Boost Technology 2.0		3.40	NVIDIA GeForce GT 740M with NVIDIA Optimus Technology	8 GB DDR3L @ 1600 MHz (max 16 GB)	1 TB (5400 RPM) Serial ATA HDD		Built-in harman/kardon stereo speakers with DTS Sound	Windows 8.1	S55-A5167
S55-A5235		Intel Core i7-3630QM with Intel Turbo Boost Technology		3.40	Mobile Intel HD Graphics	12 GB DDR3 @ 1600 MHz (max 16 GB)	1 TB (5400 RPM) Serial ATA HDD		Built-in harman/kardon stereo speakers with DTS Sound		S55-A5235
S55-A5236		Intel Core i7-4700MQ with Intel Turbo Boost Technology 2.0		3.40	Mobile Intel HD Graphics	16 GB DDR3L @ 1600 MHz (max 16 GB)	1 TB (5400 RPM) Serial ATA HDD		Built-in harman/kardon stereo speakers with DTS Sound		S55-A5236
S55-A5239		Intel Core i7-3630QM with Intel Turbo Boost Technology		3.40	Mobile Intel HD Graphics	12 GB DDR3 @ 1600 MHz (max 16 GB)	1 TB (5400 RPM) Serial ATA HDD		Built-in harman/kardon stereo speakers with DTS Sound		S55-A5239
S55-A5255		Intel Core i5-3337U with Intel Turbo Boost Technology 2.0		2.70	Mobile Intel HD Graphics	8 GB DDR3 @ 1600 MHz (max 16 GB)	1 TB (5400 RPM) Serial ATA HDD		Built-in harman/kardon stereo speakers with DTS Sound		S55-A5255
S55-A5256NR		Intel Core i7-4700MQ with Intel Turbo Boost Technology 2.0		3.40	Mobile Intel HD Graphics	8 GB DDR3L @ 1600 MHz (max. 16 GB)	1 TB (5400 RPM) Serial ATA HDD		Built-in harman/kardon stereo speakers with DTS Sound		S55-A5256NR
S55-A5257		Intel Core i7-4700MQ with Intel Turbo Boost Technology 2.0		3.40	Mobile Intel HD Graphics	8 GB DDR3L @ 1600 MHz (max. 16 GB)	750 GB (5400 RPM) Serial ATA HDD		Built-in harman/kardon stereo speakers with DTS Sound		S55-A5257
S55-A5274		Intel Core i5-3337U		2.70	NVIDIA GeForce GT 740M with NVIDIA Optimus Technology	6 GB DDR3 @ 1600 MHz (max 16 GB)	750 GB (5400 RPM) Serial ATA HDD		Built-in harman/kardon stereo speakers with DTS Sound		S55-A5274
S55-A5275		Intel Core i7-4700MQ		3.40	NVIDIA GeForce GT 740M with NVIDIA Optimus Technology	8 GB DDR3L @ 1600 MHz (max. 16 GB)	1 TB (5400 RPM) Serial ATA HDD				S55-A5275
S55-A5276		Intel Core i7-4700MQ		3.40	NVIDIA GeForce GT 740M with NVIDIA Optimus Technology	8 GB DDR3L @ 1600 MHz (max. 16 GB)	500 GB (5400 RPM) Serial ATA HDD				S55-A5276
S55-A5292NR		Intel Core i5-3230M with Intel Turbo Boost Technology		3.20	Mobile Intel HD Graphics	6 GB DDR3 @ 1600 MHz (max 16 GB)	500 GB (5400 RPM) Serial ATA HDD				S55-A5292NR
S55-A5294		Intel Core i7-3630QM with Intel Turbo Boost Technology		3.40	Mobile Intel HD Graphics	8 GB DDR3 @ 1600 MHz (max 16 GB)	750 GB (5400 RPM) Serial ATA HDD				S55-A5294
S55-A5335		Intel Core i7-3630QM with Intel Turbo Boost Technology		3.40	Mobile Intel HD Graphics	16 GB DDR3 @ 1600 MHz (max 16 GB)	1 TB (5400 RPM) Serial ATA HDD				S55-A5335
S55-A5339		Intel Core i7-3630QM with Intel Turbo Boost Technology		3.40	Mobile Intel HD Graphics	12 GB DDR3 @ 1600 MHz (max 16 GB)	1 TB (5400 RPM) Serial ATA HDD				S55-A5339
S55-A5352		Intel Core i5-3337U with Intel Turbo Boost Technology		2.70	Mobile Intel HD Graphics @ 32-1760 MB	8 GB DDR3 @ 1600 MHz (max 16 GB)	750 GB (5400 RPM) Serial ATA HDD				S55-A5352
S55-A5364		Intel Core i7-4700MQ with Intel Turbo Boost Technology 2.0		3.40	Mobile Intel HD Graphics	8 GB DDR3L @ 1600 MHz (max. 16 GB)	750 GB (5400 RPM) Serial ATA HDD				S55-A5364
S55-A5376		Intel Core i7-3630QM		3.40	Mobile Intel HD Graphics	8 GB DDR3 @ 1600 MHz (max 16 GB)	1 TB (5400 RPM) Serial ATA HDD				S55-A5376
S55-A5377		Intel Core i7-4700MQ		3.40	NVIDIA GeForce GT 740M with NVIDIA Optimus Technology	8 GB DDR3L @ 1600 MHz (max. 16 GB)	1 TB (5400 RPM) Serial ATA HDD				S55-A5377
S55D-A5366		AMD A10-5745M		2.10	AMD Radeon HD 8610G	8 GB DDR3 @ 1333 MHz (max 16 GB)	750 GB (5400 RPM) Serial ATA HDD				S55D-A5366
S55D-A5383		AMD A10-5745M		2.10	AMD Radeon HD 8610G	8 GB DDR3 @ 1600 MHz (max 16 GB)	750 GB (5400 RPM) Serial ATA HDD				S55D-A5383
S55DT-A5130		AMD A8-5545M Quad-Core		1.70	AMD Radeon HD 8510G	12 GB DDR3 @ 1333 MHz (max 16 GB)	1 TB (5400 RPM) Serial ATA HDD				S55DT-A5130
S55T-A5237		Intel Core i7-4700MQ with Intel Turbo Boost Technology 2.0	Mobile Intel HM86 Express	3.40	Mobile Intel HD Graphics	16 GB DDR3L @ 1600 MHz (max 16 GB)	1 TB (5400 RPM) Serial ATA HDD				S55T-A5237
S55T-A5238		Intel Core i7-3630QM with Intel Turbo Boost Technology	Mobile Intel HM76 Express	3.40	Mobile Intel HD Graphics	12 GB DDR3 @ 1600 MHz (max 16 GB)	1 TB (5400 RPM) Serial ATA HDD				S55T-A5238
S55T-A5258NR		Intel Core i7-4700MQ with Intel Turbo Boost Technology 2.0	Mobile Intel HM86 Express	3.40	Mobile Intel HD Graphics	8 GB DDR3L @ 1600 MHz (max 16 GB)					S55T-A5258NR
S55T-A5277		Intel Core i7-4700MQ with Intel Turbo Boost Technology 2.0	Mobile Intel HM86 Express	3.40	NVIDIA GeForce GT 740M with NVIDIA Optimus technology with 2 GB GDDR3						S55T-A5277
S55T-A5334		Intel Core i7-4700MQ with Intel Turbo Boost Technology 2.0	Mobile Intel HM86 Express	3.40	Mobile Intel HD Graphics						S55T-A5334
S55T-A5337		Intel Core i7-4700MQ with Intel Turbo Boost Technology 2.0	Mobile Intel HM86 Express	3.40	Mobile Intel HD Graphics						S55T-A5337
S55T-A5379		Intel Core i7-3630QM with Intel Turbo Boost Technology 2.0		3.40	Mobile Intel HD Graphics						S55T-A5379
S55T-A5389		Intel Core i7-4700MQ with Intel Turbo Boost Technology 2.0		3.40	Mobile Intel HD Graphics						S55T-A5389
S55T-B5233		Intel Core i7-4710HQ		3.50	Mobile Intel HD Graphics						S55T-B5233
S55T-B5260		Intel Core i7-4710HQ		3.50	Mobile Intel HD Graphics						S55T-B5260
S55T-B5273NR		Intel Core i7-4710HQ		3.50	Mobile Intel HD Graphics						S55T-B5273NR
S55T-C5134		Intel Core i5-6200U		2.80	Mobile Intel HD Graphics						S55T-C5134
S55T-C5322		Intel Core-i7-6500U		3.10							S55T-C5322
S70-ABT2N22		Intel Core i3-3120M		2.50							S70-ABT2N22
S70-AST3GX1		Intel Core i7-4700MQ		3.40							S70-AST3GX1
S70-AST3NX1		Intel Core i5-4200M		3.10							S70-AST3NX1
S70-AST3NX2		Intel Core i7-4700MQ		3.40							S70-AST3NX2
S70-BBT2N23		Intel Core i7-4720HQ with Intel Turbo Boost Technology 2.0		3.60						Windows 10 Home	S70-BBT2N23
S70-BST2NX2		Intel Core i7-4720HQ with Intel Turbo Boost Technology 2.0		3.60		16 GB DDR3L @ 1600 MHz (max. 16 GB)				Windows 10 Home	S70-BST2NX2
S70T-BST2GX4		Intel Core i7-4720HQ with Intel Turbo Boost Technology 2.0		3.60							S70T-BST2GX4
S70T-BST2GX5		Intel Core i7-4720HQ with Intel Turbo Boost Technology 2.0		3.60							S70T-BST2GX5
S70T-BST3GX1		Intel Core i7-4720HQ with Intel Turbo Boost Technology 2.0		3.60							S70T-BST3GX1
S75-A7221		Intel Core i7-4700MQ with Intel Turbo Boost Technology 2.0		3.40							S75-A7221
S75-A7222		Intel Core i7-4700MQ with Intel Turbo Boost Technology 2.0		3.40							S75-A7222
S75-A7270		Intel Core i5-3230M with Intel Turbo Boost Technology		3.20		8 GB DDR3 @ 1600 MHz (max 16 GB)					S75-A7270
S75-A7331		Intel Core i7-4700MQ with Intel Turbo Boost Technology 2.0		3.40		16 GB DDR3L @ 1600 MHz (max 16 GB)					S75-A7331
S75-A7334		Intel Core i7-4700MQ with Intel Turbo Boost Technology 2.0		3.40							S75-A7334
S75-A7344		Intel Core i5-3230M with Intel Turbo Boost Technology		3.20							S75-A7344
S75D-A7272	17.3” TruBrite TFT LCD @ 1920x1080 native resolution (FHD)	AMD A10-5750M with AMD Turbo Core Technology 3.0		2.50	AMD Radeon HD 8650G					Windows 8	S75D-A7272
S75D-A7346	17.3” TruBrite TFT LCD @ 1920x1080 native resolution (FHD)	AMD A10-5750M with AMD Turbo Core Technology 3.0		2.50	AMD Radeon HD 8650G					Windows 8	S75D-A7346
S75DT-A7330	17.3” TruBrite TFT at 1600x900 native resolution (HD+) with touchscreen	AMD A10-5750M with AMD Turbo Core Technology 3.0		2.50	AMD Radeon HD 8650G					Windows 8	S75DT-A7330
S75T-A7215	17.3” TruBrite TFT at 1920x1080 native resolution (FHD) with touchscreen	Intel Core i7-4700MQ with Intel Turbo Boost Technology 2.0	Mobile Intel HM86 Express	3.40	Mobile Intel HD Graphics						S75T-A7215
S75T-A7217	17.3” TruBrite TFT at 1920x1080 native resolution (FHD) with touchscreen	Intel Core i7-4700MQ with Intel Turbo Boost Technology 2.0	Mobile Intel HM86 Express	3.40	Mobile Intel HD Graphics						S75T-A7217
S75T-A7220	17.3” TruBrite TFT at 1920x1080 native resolution (FHD) with touchscreen	Intel Core i7-4700MQ with Intel Turbo Boost Technology 2.0	Mobile Intel HM86 Express	3.40	Mobile Intel HD Graphics						S75T-A7220
S75T-A7335	17.3” TruBrite TFT at 1600x900 native resolution (HD+) with touchscreen	Intel Core i7-4700MQ with Intel Turbo Boost Technology 2.0	Mobile Intel HM86 Express	3.40	Mobile Intel HD Graphics						S75T-A7335
S75T-A7349	17.3” TruBrite TFT at 1600x900 native resolution (HD+) with touchscreen	Intel Core i7-4700MQ with Intel Turbo Boost Technology 2.0	Mobile Intel HM86 Express	3.40	Mobile Intel HD Graphics						S75T-A7349
S845D-SP4212TL		AMD A8-4500M		2.80	AMD Radeon HD 7640G	6 GB DDR3 @ 1600 MHz (max. 16 GB)	750 GB (5400 RPM) Serial ATA HDD		Built-in stereo speakers with SRS Premium Sound HD	Windows 7 Home Premium	S845D-SP4212TL
S845D-SP4276LM		AMD A6-4400M		3.20	AMD Radeon HD 7520G	6 GB DDR3 @ 1600 MHz (max. 16 GB)	750 GB (5400 RPM) Serial ATA HDD		Built-in stereo speakers with SRS Premium Sound HD	Windows 7 Home Premium	S845D-SP4276LM
S855D-S5120		AMD A10-4600M with AMD Turbo Core Technology 3.0		2.30	AMD Radeon HD 7660G	8 GB DDR3 @ 1600 MHz (max 16 GB)	750 GB (5400 RPM) Serial ATA HDD		Built-in stereo speakers with SRS Premium Sound HD	Windows 8	S855D-S5120
S855D-S5148		AMD A10-4600M with AMD Turbo Core Technology 3.0		2.30	AMD Radeon HD 7660G	8 GB DDR3 @ 1600 MHz (max 16 GB)	1 TB (5400 RPM) Serial ATA HDD		Built-in stereo speakers with SRS Premium Sound HD	Windows 7 Home Premium	S855D-S5148
S855D-S5253		AMD A10-4600M with AMD Turbo Core Technology 3.0		3.20	AMD Radeon HD 7660G	6 GB DDR3 @ 1600 MHz (max 16 GB)	750 GB (5400 RPM) Serial ATA HDD		Built-in stereo speakers with SRS Premium Sound HD	Windows 7 Home Premium	S855D-S5253
S855D-S5256		AMD A10-4600M with AMD Turbo Core Technology 3.0		2.30	AMD Radeon HD 7660G	6 GB DDR3 @ 1600 MHz (max 16 GB)	750 GB (5400 RPM) Serial ATA HDD		Built-in stereo speakers with SRS Premium Sound HD		S855D-S5256
S855D-SP5261LM		AMD A8-4500M with AMD Turbo Core Technology 3.0	AMD A70M	2.80	AMD Radeon HD 7640G	8 GB @ DDR3 1600 MHz (max 8 GB)	750 GB (5400 RPM) Serial ATA HDD				S855D-SP5261LM
S855D-SP5262LM		AMD A8-4500M with AMD Turbo Core Technology 3.0	AMD A70M	1.90	AMD Radeon HD 7640G	4 GB DDR3 @ 1600 MHz (max 16 GB)	640 GB (5400 RPM) Serial ATA HDD				S855D-SP5262LM
S855-S5164		Intel Core i5-3230M with Intel Turbo Boost Technology	Mobile Intel HM76 Express	3.20	AMD Radeon HD 7670M	6 GB DDR3 @ 1600 MHz (max 16 GB)	750 GB (5400 RPM) Serial ATA HDD				S855-S5164
S855-S5165		Intel Core i7-3630QM with Intel Turbo Boost Technology	Mobile Intel HM76 Express	3.40	Mobile Intel HD Graphics						S855-S5165
S855-S5168		Intel Core i7-3630QM with Intel Turbo Boost Technology	Mobile Intel HM76 Express	3.40	Mobile Intel HD Graphics						S855-S5168
S855-S5170		Intel Core i7-3630QM with Intel Turbo Boost Technology	Mobile Intel HM76 Express	3.40	AMD Radeon HD 7670M						S855-S5170
S855-S5188		Intel Core i7-3630QM with Intel Turbo Boost Technology	Mobile Intel HM76 Express	3.40	AMD Radeon HD 7670M						S855-S5188
S855-S5251		Intel Core i5-2450M with Turbo Boost Technology 2.0	Mobile Intel HM76 Express	2.50	Mobile Intel HD Graphics						S855-S5251
S855-S5252		Intel Core i5-2450M with Turbo Boost Technology 2.0	Mobile Intel HM76 Express	2.50	Mobile Intel HD Graphics						S855-S5252
S855-S5254		Intel Core i7-3610QM with Turbo Boost Technology 2.0		2.30	Mobile Intel HD Graphics						S855-S5254
S855-S5257		Intel Core i7-3610QM with Turbo Boost Technology 2.0		2.30							S855-S5257
S855-S5264		Intel Core i7-3610QM with Turbo Boost Technology 2.0		2.30							S855-S5264
S855-S5265		Intel Core i7-3610QM with Turbo Boost Technology 2.0		2.30							S855-S5265
S855-S5266		Intel Core i7-3610QM with Turbo Boost Technology 2.0		2.30							S855-S5266
S855-S5267		Intel Core i7-3610QM with Turbo Boost Technology 2.0		2.30							S855-S5267
S855-S5268		Intel Core i7-3610QM with Turbo Boost Technology 2.0		2.30							S855-S5268
S855-S5369		Intel Core i5-3210M		3.10							S855-S5369
S855-S5377N		Intel Core i5-3210M		3.10							S855-S5377N
S855-S5378		Intel Core i7-3630QM		3.40							S855-S5378
S855-S5379		Intel Core i7-3630QM		3.40							S855-S5379
S855-S5380		Intel Core i5-3210M with Intel Turbo Boost Technology		3.10	AMD Radeon HD 7670M						S855-S5380
S855-S5381		Intel Core i7-3630QM with Intel Turbo Boost Technology		3.40	Mobile Intel HD Graphics						S855-S5381
S855-S5382		Intel Core i7-3630QM with Intel Turbo Boost Technology		3.40	AMD Radeon HD 7670M						S855-S5382
S855-S5384		Intel Core i7-3630QM with Intel Turbo Boost Technology		3.40	AMD Radeon HD 7670M						S855-S5384
S855-S5386		Intel Core i7-3630QM with Intel Turbo Boost Technology		3.40	AMD Radeon HD 7670M						S855-S5386
S870-BT2G22		Intel Core i7-3610QM with Turbo Boost Technology 2.0		2.30	AMD Radeon HD 7670M					Windows 7 Home Premium 64-bit, SP1	S870-BT2G22
S875D-S7239		AMD A10-4600M with AMD Turbo Core Technology 3.0		2.30	AMD Radeon HD 7660G				Built-in stereo speakers with SRS Premium Sound HD	Windows 7 Home Premium 64-bit, SP1	S875D-S7239
S875D-S7350		AMD A10-4600M with AMD Turbo Core Technology 3.0		2.30	AMD Radeon HD 7660G				Built-in stereo speakers with SRS Premium Sound HD	Windows 8	S875D-S7350
S875-S7240		Intel Core i5-2450M with Turbo Boost Technology 2.0		2.50	Mobile Intel HD Graphics				Built-in stereo speakers with SRS Premium Sound HD	Windows 7 Home Premium 64-bit, SP1	S875-S7240
S875-S7248		Intel Core i7-3610QM with Turbo Boost Technology 2.0		2.30	AMD Radeon HD 7670M	8 GB DDR3 @ 1600 MHz (max 16 GB)	1 TB (5400 RPM) Serial ATA HDD		Built-in stereo speakers with SRS Premium Sound HD	Windows 7 Home Premium 64-bit, SP1	S875-S7248
S875-S7356		Intel Core i5-3210M with Intel Turbo Boost Technology		3.10	Mobile Intel HD Graphics	6 GB DDR3 @ 1600 MHz (max 16 GB)	750 GB (5400 RPM) Serial ATA HDD		Built-in stereo speakers with SRS Premium Sound HD		S875-S7356
S875-S7370		Intel Core i7-3630QM with Intel Turbo Boost Technology		3.40	Mobile Intel HD Graphics	8 GB DDR3 @ 1600 MHz (max 16 GB)	750 GB (5400 RPM) Serial ATA HDD				S875-S7370
S875-S7376		Intel Core i7-3630QM with Intel Turbo Boost Technology		3.40	AMD Radeon HD 7670M with 1 GB DDR3		1 TB (5400 RPM) Serial ATA HDD				S875-S7376
S955D-S5150		AMD A8-4555M with AMD Turbo Core Technology 3.0		1.60	AMD Radeon HD 7600G		1 TB (5400 RPM) Serial ATA HDD				S955D-S5150
S955D-S5374		AMD A8-4555M with AMD Turbo Core Technology 3.0		1.60	AMD Radeon HD 7600G		750 GB (5400 RPM) Serial ATA HDD				S955D-S5374
S955-S5166		Intel Core i5-3337U with Intel Turbo Boost Technology		2.70	Mobile Intel HD Graphics @ 64-1696 MB		1 TB (5400 RPM) Serial ATA HDD				S955-S5166
S955-S5373		Intel Core i5-3317U with Intel Turbo Boost Technology		2.60	Mobile Intel HD Graphics @ 64-1696 MB		1 TB (5400 RPM) Serial ATA HDD				S955-S5373
S955-S5376		Intel Core i5-3317U with Intel Turbo Boost Technology		2.60	Mobile Intel HD Graphics @ 64-1696 MB		750 GB (5400 RPM) Serial ATA HDD				S955-S5376
