= Commodore 4040 =

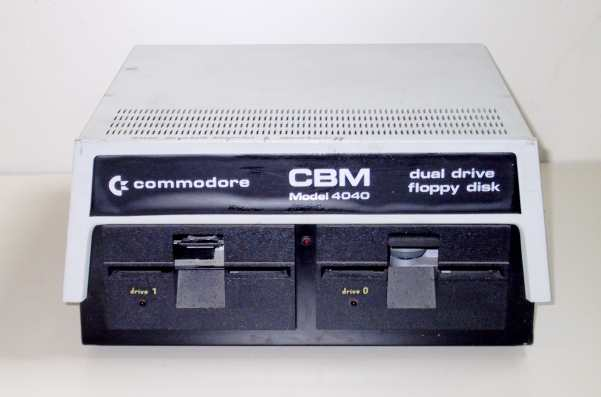
- Front view of the Commodore 4040 dual disk drive.
- Manufacturer: Commodore Business Machines, Inc.
- Type: Floppy disk drive
- Media: 2 × 5¼" double-sided floppy disk SS SD
- Operating system: CBM DOS 2.6
- CPU: MOS 6502 & MOS 6504 @ 1 MHz
- Memory: 4 KB SRAM (8 × 2114), 10 KB ROM (1 × 6332, 1 × 6316)
- Storage: 170 KB per disk
- Connectivity: Parallel IEEE-488
- Backward compatibility: Commodore PET/CBM, 4000-series, 8000-series, B128
- Predecessor: Commodore 2040 & 3040
- Successor: Commodore 8050 & 8250
- Related: Commodore 2031 & 1541

The Commodore 4040 is the replacement for the previous models 2040 (U.S.) and 3040 (Europe). It's a dual-drive 5¼" floppy disk subsystem for Commodore Business Machines. It uses a wide-case form, and uses the parallel IEEE-488 interface common to Commodore PET/CBM computers.

These drive models use a single-density, single-side floppy data storage format similar to that used by the Commodore 1540 & 1541 drives, but with a slightly different data marker indicating which model formatted the disk. The low-level disk format is similar enough to allow reading between models, but different enough that one series of drive models cannot reliably write to disks formatted with one of the other model series. A difference of one extra header byte is what causes this write incompatibility.

The Group Coded Recording (GCR) scheme of binary encoding is used to store data on the magnetic disk medium. The drive also uses variable bit-clock to enable increased data density on a standard single-density floppy disk. It is a form of constant bit-density recording done by gradually increasing the clock rate (zone constant angular velocity, ZCAV) and storing more physical sectors on the outer tracks than on the inner ones (zone bit recording, ZBR). Starting with the Commodore 2040 drive, this enabled Commodore to fit 170 KB on a standard single-sided single-density 5.25" floppy.
