= Toshiba Satellite P series =

Series of laptops by Toshiba

Satellite P series
- Developer: Toshiba Information Systems Corporation (2003–2016)
- Type: Laptop

The Satellite P series was Toshiba Information Systems's secondary premium line of Satellite laptops introduced in 2003. It later eclipsed Toshiba's primary premium line of Satellites, the A series, in 2011.

The first entry in the series, the P25, was one of the first laptops to feature a widescreen 17-in LCD, following in the footsteps of Apple's PowerBook G4 released the same year. The P25 was also one of the first laptops to feature an internal DVD±RW drive. PC Magazine rated it well as a multimedia system.

P series models introduced in 2012 were priced at US$800, $100 higher than their midrange S series counterparts. Features of the 2012-issue P series models included Nvidia GeForce graphics processing units, Harman Kardon speakers, optional touchscreen displays and backlit keyboards as standard. Toshiba offered 15.6- or 17.3-inch-diagonal screens for these models at 1080p resolution, with a bevel-free design for the display housings. The integrated graphics chip and HDMI ports also supported 4K output.

Toshiba discontinued the P series in 2016 along with the entire Satellite line of laptops.

== Models ==
Toshiba Satellite P series models
Model no.	Display	Processor	Chipset	Clock speed (GHz)	Graphics	RAM	Storage	Networking	Audio	Operating system	Reference
P105-S6012	17.0” TruBrite TFT @ 1440x900 (WXGA)	Intel Core Duo T2300 with Intel Centrino Duo Mobile Technology	Mobile Intel 945GM	1.66	Intel Graphics Media Accelerator 950	1024 MB DDR2 SDRAM	160 GB HDD (4200 RPM)	Toshiba V.92 software modem10; Intel PRO/100 VE Network Connection - 10/100 Base-TX Ethernet; Integrated Intel Pro/Wireless Network Connection 3945ABG (802.11a/b/g)11	Built-in harman/kardonstereo speakers with SRS Labs audio enhancements, 16-bit stereo software sound and Sound Volume Control Dial	Windows XP Professional	P105-S6012
P105-S6014		Intel Core Duo T2300 with Intel Centrino Duo Mobile Technology	Mobile Intel 945GM	1.66	Intel Graphics Media Accelerator 950	1024 MB DDR2 SDRAM	160 GB HDD (4200 RPM)	Toshiba V.92 software modem10; Intel PRO/100 VE Network Connection - 10/100 Base-TX Ethernet; Integrated Intel Pro/Wireless Network Connection 3945ABG (802.11a/b/g)11	Built-in harman/kardonstereo speakers with SRS Labs audio enhancements, 16-bit stereo software sound and Sound Volume Control Dial	Windows XP Media Center Edition 2005	P105-S6014
P105-S921		Intel Core Duo T2400 with Intel Centrino Duo Mobile Technology	Mobile Intel 945GM	1.83	NVIDIA GeForce Go 7900 GS	1024 MB DDR2 SDRAM	160 GB HDD (4200 RPM)	Toshiba V.92 software modem10; Intel PRO/100 VE Network Connection - 10/100 Base-TX Ethernet; Integrated Intel Pro/Wireless Network Connection 3945ABG (802.11a/b/g)11	Built-in harman/kardonstereo speakers with SRS Labs audio enhancements, 16-bit stereo software sound and Sound Volume Control Dial	Windows XP Professional	P105-S921
P205D-S7429		AMD Athlon 64 X2 Dual-Core TK-55 with HyperTransport Technology	AMD M690V	1.80	ATI Radeon Xpress X1200M	1024 MB PC2-5300 DDR2 SDRAM	120 GB HDD (4200 RPM)	Modem; 10/100 Ethernet; Integrated Wi-Fi compliant wireless; Atheros 802.11b/g wireless-LAN	Built-in stereo speakers and Sound Volume Control Dial	Windows Vista Home Premium (32-bit version)	P205D-S7429
P205D-S7436		AMD Athlon 64 X2 Dual-Core TK-53 with HyperTransport Technology	AMD M690V	1.70	ATI Radeon Xpress X1200M	2048 MB PC2-5300 DDR2 SDRAM	120 GB HDD (4200 RPM)	Modem; 10/100 Ethernet; Integrated Wi-Fi compliant wireless; Atheros 802.11b/g wireless-LAN	Built-in stereo speakers and Sound Volume Control Dial	Windows Vista Home Premium (32-bit version)	P205D-S7436
P205D-S7438		AMD Athlon 64 X2 Dual-Core TK-55 with HyperTransport Technology	AMD M690V	1.80	ATI Radeon Xpress X1200M	1024 MB PC2-5300 DDR2 SDRAM	160 GB HDD (4200 RPM)	Modem; 10/100 Ethernet; Integrated Wi-Fi compliant wireless; Atheros 802.11b/g wireless-LAN	Built-in stereo speakers and Sound Volume Control Dial	Windows Vista Home Premium (32-bit version)	P205D-S7438
P205D-S7439		AMD Athlon 64 X2 Dual-Core TK-55 with HyperTransport Technology	AMD M690V	1.80	ATI Radeon Xpress X1200M	1024 MB PC2-5300 DDR2 SDRAM	160 GB HDD (4200 RPM)		Built-in stereo speakers and Sound Volume Control Dial		P205D-S7439
P205D-S7454		AMD Turion 64 X2 Dual-Core Mobile TL-58	AMD M690V	1.90	ATI Radeon Xpress X1200M	2048 MB PC2-5300 DDR2 SDRAM	160 GB HDD (4200 RPM)		Built-in stereo speakers and Sound Volume Control Dial		P205D-S7454
P205D-S7479		AMD Turion 64 X2 Dual-Core Mobile Gold Edition TL-64	AMD M690	2.20	ATI Mobility Radeon HD 2600 @ 256 MB DDR	2048 MB PC2-5300 DDR2 SDRAM	250 GB (4200 RPM) Serial ATA HDD		Built-in harman/kardon 2 stereo speakers with sub-woofer and Sound Volume Control Dial		P205D-S7479
P205D-S7802		AMD Turion 64 X2 Dual-Core Mobile TL-58	AMD M690V	1.90	ATI Radeon X1200 @ 128-319 MB	2048 MB PC2-5300 DDR2 SDRAM	160 GB (5400 RPM) Serial ATA HDD		Built-in stereo speakers and Sound Volume Control Dial		P205D-S7802
P205D-S8802		AMD Turion 64 X2 Dual-Core Mobile TL-60	AMD M690V	2.00	ATI Radeon X1200 @ 128-319 MB	2048 MB PC2-5300 DDR2 SDRAM	200 GB (5400 RPM) Serial ATA HDD		Built-in stereo speakers and Sound Volume Control Dial		P205D-S8802
P205D-S8804		AMD Turion 64 X2 Dual-Core Mobile TL-60	AMD M690V	2.00	ATI Radeon X1200 @ 128-319 MB	2048 MB PC2-5300 DDR2 SDRAM	200 GB (5400 RPM) Serial ATA HDD		Built-in stereo speakers and Sound Volume Control Dial		P205D-S8804
P205D-S8806		AMD Turion 64 X2 Dual-Core Mobile Gold Edition TL-64	AMD M690V	2.20	ATI Radeon X1200 @ 128-319 MB	2048 MB PC2-5300 DDR2 SDRAM	200 GB (5400 RPM) Serial ATA HDD		Built-in stereo speakers and Sound Volume Control Dial		P205D-S8806
P205D-S8812		AMD Turion 64 X2 Dual-Core Mobile Gold Edition TL-64	AMD M690	2.20	ATI Mobility Radeon HD 2400 @ 128 MB DDR	3072 MB PC2-5300 DDR2 SDRAM	250 GB (5400 RPM) Serial ATA HDD		Built-in harman/kardon 2 stereo speakers with sub-woofer and Sound Volume Control Dial		P205D-S8812
P205-S7804		Intel Pentium Dual-Core T2330	Mobile Intel GL960 Express	1.60	Mobile Intel Graphics Media Accelerator X3100 @ 64-251 MB	2048 MB PC2-5300 DDR2 SDRAM	120 GB (5400 RPM) Serial ATA HDD		Built-in stereo speakers & microphone and Sound Volume Control Dial		P205-S7804
P205-S7806		Intel Pentium Dual-Core T2330	Mobile Intel GL960 Express	1.60	Mobile Intel Graphics Media Accelerator X3100 @ 64-251 MB	2048 MB PC2-5300 DDR2 SDRAM	250 GB (5400 RPM) Serial ATA HDD		Built-in stereo speakers & microphone and Sound Volume Control Dial		P205-S7806
P205-S8811		Intel Core 2 Duo T5450 with Intel Centrino Technology	Mobile Intel GM965 Express	1.66	Mobile Intel Graphics Media Accelerator X3100 @ 64-251 MB	3072 MB PC2-5300 DDR2 SDRAM	250 GB (5400 RPM) Serial ATA HDD		Built-in stereo speakers & microphone and Sound Volume Control Dial		P205-S8811
P300D-ST3711		AMD Turion 64 X2 Dual-Core Mobile RM-72	AMD M780 series	2.10	ATI Radeon 3100 with 256-1407 MB	4 GB PC6400 DDR2 SDRAM	320 GB (5400 RPM) Serial ATA HDD		Built-in harman/kardon stereo speakers & microphone and Sound Volume Control Dial		P300D-ST3711
P300-ST3014		Intel Pentium Dual-Core T2390	Mobile Intel GM965 Express	1.86	Mobile Intel Graphics Media Accelerator X3100 with 128-358 MB	1024 MB DDR2 SDRAM	120 GB (5400 RPM) Serial ATA HDD		Built-in harman/kardon stereo speakers & microphone and Sound Volume Control Dial		P300-ST3014
P300-ST3712		Intel Core 2 Duo T6400 with Intel Centrino Technology	Mobile Intel GM45 Express	2.00	Intel Graphics Media Accelerator 4500MHD with 128-1759 MB	4 GB PC6400 DDR2 SDRAM	500 GB (5400 RPM) Serial ATA HDD		Built-in harman/kardon stereo speakers & microphone and Sound Volume Control Dial		P300-ST3712
P300-ST6711		Intel Pentium T3400	Mobile Intel GM45 Express	2.00	Mobile Intel Graphics Media Accelerator 4500MHD with 128-248 MB	1 GB DDR2 SDRAM	160 GB (5400 RPM) Serial ATA HDD		Built-in harman/kardon stereo speakers & microphone and Sound Volume Control Dial		P300-ST6711
P305D-S8818		AMD Turion 64 X2 Dual-Core Mobile TL-62	AMD M690G	2.10 (800 MHz with HyperTransport )	ATI Radeon 3100 with 256-1407 MB						P305D-S8818
P305D-S8819		AMD Turion 64 X2 Dual-Core Mobile TL-62	AMD M690G	2.10 (800 MHz with HyperTransport )	ATI Radeon X1250 with 128-831 MB						P305D-S8819
P305D-S8828		AMD Turion 64 X2 Dual-Core Mobile RM-70	AMD M780V	2.00	ATI Radeon 3100 with 256-1407 MB						P305D-S8828
P305D-S8829		AMD Turion 64 X2 Dual-Core Mobile RM-70	AMD M780V	2.00	ATI Radeon 3100 with 256-1407 MB						P305D-S8829
P305D-S8834		AMD Turion 64 X2 Dual-Core Mobile RM-70	AMD M780V	2.00	ATI Radeon 3100 with 256-1407 MB						P305D-S8834
P305D-S88361		AMD Turion 64 X2 Dual-Core Mobile RM-70	AMD M780V	2.00	ATI Radeon 3100 with 256-1407 MB						P305D-S88361
P305D-S8836		AMD Turion 64 X2 Dual-Core Mobile RM-70	AMD M780V	2.00	ATI Radeon 3100 with 256-1407 MB						P305D-S8836
P305D-S8900		AMD Turion 64 X2 Dual-Core Mobile RM-70	AMD M780V	2.00	ATI Radeon 3100 with 256-1407 MB						P305D-S8900
P305D-S8903		AMD Turion 64 X2 Dual-Core Mobile RM-70	AMD M780V	2.00	ATI Radeon 3100 with 256-1407 MB						P305D-S8903
P305D-S8995E		AMD Turion 64 X2 Dual-Core Mobile TL-60	AMD M690G	2.00 (800 MHz with HyperTransport)	ATI Radeon X1250 with 128-831 MB						P305D-S8995E
P305-S8814		Intel Pentium Dual-Core T2370	Mobile Intel GL960 Express	1.73	Mobile Intel Graphics Media Accelerator X3100						P305-S8814
P305-S8820		Intel Core 2 Duo T5550 with Intel Centrino Technology	Mobile Intel GM965 Express	1.83	Mobile Intel Graphics Media Accelerator X3100						P305-S8820
P305-S8822		Intel Core 2 Duo T5550 with Intel Centrino Technology	Mobile Intel PM965 Express	1.83							P305-S8822
P305-S8823		Intel Core 2 Duo T5550 with Intel Centrino Technology	Mobile Intel PM965 Express	1.83							P305-S8823
P305-S8825		Intel Core 2 Duo T5550 with Intel Centrino Technology	Mobile Intel PM965 Express	1.83							P305-S8825
P305-S8826		Intel Core 2 Duo T5550 with Intel Centrino Technology	Mobile Intel GM965 Express	1.83							P305-S8826
P305-S8830		Intel Core 2 Duo T5750 with Intel Centrino Technology	Mobile Intel GM965 Express	2.00							P305-S8830
P305-S8832		Intel Core 2 Duo T5750 with Intel Centrino Technology	Mobile Intel GM965 Express	2.00							P305-S8832
P305-S8838		Intel Core 2 Duo T5750 with Intel Centrino Technology	Mobile Intel PM965 Express	2.00							P305-S8838
P305-S8842		Intel Core 2 Duo T5750 with Intel Centrino Technology	Mobile Intel PM965 Express	2.00							P305-S8842
P305-S8844		Intel Core 2 Duo P7350 with Intel Centrino 2 Technology	Mobile Intel GM45 Express	2.00							P305-S8844
P305-S8854		Intel Core 2 Duo T5800 with Intel Centrino Technology	Mobile Intel GM45 Express	2.00							P305-S8854
P305-S89041		Intel Core 2 Duo T6400 with Intel Centrino Technology	Mobile Intel GM45 Express	2.00							P305-S89041
P305-S8904		Intel Core 2 Duo T6400 with Intel Centrino Technology	Mobile Intel GM45 Express	2.00							P305-S8904
P305-S8906		Intel Core 2 Duo T6400 with Intel Centrino Technology	Mobile Intel PM45 Express	2.00							P305-S8906
P305-S8909		Intel Core 2 Duo T6400 with Intel Centrino Technology	Mobile Intel PM45 Express	2.00							P305-S8909
P305-S8910		Intel Core 2 Duo P7450 with Intel Centrino 2 Technology	Mobile Intel GM45 Express	2.13							P305-S8910
P305-S89151		Intel Core 2 Duo T6400 with Intel Centrino Technology	Mobile Intel PM45 Express	2.00							P305-S89151
P305-S8915		Intel Core 2 Duo T6400 with Intel Centrino Technology	Mobile Intel PM45 Express	2.00							P305-S8915
P305-S8919		Intel Core 2 Duo T9550 with Intel Centrino 2 Technology	Mobile Intel PM45 Express	2.66							P305-S8919
P305-S8920		Intel Core 2 Duo P7450 with Intel Centrino 2 Technology	Mobile Intel PM45 Express	2.13							P305-S8920
P305-S8996E		Intel Core 2 Duo T6400 with Intel Centrino Technology	Mobile Intel GM965 Express	2.00							P305-S8996E
P305-S8997E		Intel Core 2 Duo T8100 with Intel Centrino Technology	Mobile Intel GM965 Express	2.10							P305-S8997E
P305-ST771E		Intel Core 2 Duo T5750 with Intel Centrino Technology	Mobile Intel PM45 Express	2.00							P305-ST771E
P30-S701TD		Intel Celeron D 340	ATI Radeon Xpress 200M	2.93	ATI Radeon Xpress 200M						P30-S701TD
P500-BT2G22		Intel Core i7-740QM	Mobile Intel HM55 Express	1.73	NVIDIA GeForce 310M with 512 MB GDDR3						P500-BT2G22
P500-BT2N20		Intel Core i3-350M	Mobile Intel HM55 Express	2.26	Mobile Intel Graphics Media Accelerator HD						P500-BT2N20
P500D-ST5805		AMD Turion II Dual-Core Mobile M500		2.20	ATI Radeon 4100						P500D-ST5805
P500-ST2G01		Intel Core i5-450M	Mobile Intel HM55 Express	2.40	NVIDIA GeForce 310M with 512 MB GDDR3						P500-ST2G01
P500-ST2G02		Intel Core i5-460M	Mobile Intel HM55 Express	2.53	NVIDIA GeForce GT330M with 1 GB GDDR3						P500-ST2G02
P500-ST5801		Intel Core 2 Duo P7350 with Intel Centrino 2 Technology	Mobile Intel GM45 Express	2.00	ATI Mobility Radeon HD 4650 with 1 GB DDR3						P500-ST5801
P500-ST5806		Intel Core 2 Duo P7450	Mobile Intel GM45 Express	2.13	NVIDIA GeForce G 230M with 1 GB GDDR3						P500-ST5806
P500-ST5807		Intel Core i7-720QM	Mobile Intel HM55 Express	1.60 (2.80 with TurboBoost)	NVIDIA GeForce 310M with 512 MB GDDR3						P500-ST5807
P500-ST58E1		Intel Core 2 Duo P8700	Mobile Intel GM45 Express	2.53	Intel Graphics Media Accelerator 4500MHD						P500-ST58E1
P500-ST6821		Intel Core 2 Duo T6500 with Intel Centrino Technology	Mobile Intel GM45 Express	2.10	Mobile Intel Graphics Media Accelerator 4500MHD with 285-1341 MB						P500-ST6821
P500-ST6822		Intel Core 2 Duo T6600	Mobile Intel GM45 Express	2.0–2.80	Mobile Intel Graphics Media Accelerator 4500MHD with 285-1341 MB						P500-ST6822
P500-ST6844		Intel Core i3-330M	Mobile Intel HM55 Express	2.13	Intel Graphics Media Accelerator HD						P500-ST6844
P500-ST68X1		Intel Core 2 Duo P7450	Mobile Intel GM45 Express	2.13	Intel Graphics Media Accelerator 4500MHD						P500-ST68X1
P500-ST68X2		Intel Core i7-720QM	Mobile Intel HM55 Express	1.60	NVIDIA GeForce GT330M with 1 GB GDDR3						P500-ST68X2
P505D-S8000		AMD Turion II Dual-Core Mobile M520	AMD M880G	2.30	ATI Radeon HD 4200 with 256-1919 MB						P505D-S8000
P505D-S8005		AMD Turion II Ultra Dual-Core Mobile M620	AMD M880G	2.50	ATI Radeon HD 4200 with 256-1919 MB						P505D-S8005
P505D-S8007		AMD Turion II Dual-Core Mobile M520	AMD M880G	2.30	ATI Radeon HD 4200 with 256-1919 MB						P505D-S8007
P505D-S8930		AMD Turion 64 X2 Dual-Core Mobile RM-74	AMD M780G	2.20	ATI Radeon HD 3200 with 256-1662 MB						P505D-S8930
P505D-S8934		AMD Turion 64 X2 Dual-Core Mobile RM-74	AMD M780G	2.20	ATI Radeon HD 3200 with 256-1662 MB						P505D-S8934
P505D-S8935		AMD Turion 64 X2 Dual-Core Mobile RM-74	AMD M780G	2.20	ATI Radeon HD 3200 with 256-1662 MB						P505D-S8935
P505D-S8960		AMD Turion II Dual-Core Mobile M500		2.20	ATI Radeon 4100						P505D-S8960
P505-S8010		Intel Core i3-330M	Mobile Intel HM55 Express	2.13	NVIDIA GeForce 310M with 512 MB GDDR3						P505-S8010
P505-S8011		Intel Core i7-720QM	Mobile Intel HM55 Express	1.60 (2.80 with TurboBoost)	NVIDIA GeForce 310M with 512 MB GDDR3						P505-S8011
P505-S8020		Intel Core i3-350M	Mobile Intel HM55 Express	2.26	Mobile Intel HD Graphics @ 64 – 1696 MB						P505-S8020
P505-S8022		Intel Core i3-350M	Mobile Intel HM55 Express	2.26	Mobile Intel HD Graphics @ 64 – 1696 MB						P505-S8022
P505-S8025		Intel Core i5-450M	Mobile Intel HM55 Express	2.40 (2.53 with TurboBoost)	NVIDIA GeForce GT330M with 1 GB GDDR3						P505-S8025
P505-S8940		Intel Core 2 Duo T6500 with Intel Centrino Technology	Mobile Intel GM45 Express	2.10	ATI Mobility Radeon HD 4570 with 512 MB DDR3						P505-S8940
P505-S8941		Intel Core 2 Duo T6500 with Intel Centrino Technology	Mobile Intel GM45 Express	2.10	ATI Mobility Radeon HD 4570 with 512 MB DDR3						P505-S8941
P505-S8945		Intel Core 2 Duo P7350 with Intel Centrino 2 Technology	Mobile Intel GM45 Express	2.00	ATI Mobility Radeon HD 4650 with 1 GB DDR3						P505-S8945
P505-S8946		Intel Core 2 Duo P7350 with Intel Centrino 2 Technology	Mobile Intel GM45 Express	2.00	ATI Mobility Radeon HD 4650 with 1 GB DDR3						P505-S8946
P505-S8950		Intel Core 2 Duo P8700 with Intel Centrino 2 Technology	Mobile Intel GM45 Express	2.53	ATI Mobility Radeon HD 4650 with 1 GB DDR3						P505-S8950
P505-S8970		Intel Core 2 Duo T6600	Mobile Intel GM45 Express	2.20	NVIDIA GeForce G 210M with 512 MB GDDR3						P505-S8970
P505-S8971		Intel Core 2 Duo T6600	Mobile Intel GM45 Express	2.20	NVIDIA GeForce G 210M with 512 MB GDDR3						P505-S8971
P505-ST5800		Intel Core 2 Duo T6500 with Intel Centrino Technology	Mobile Intel GM45 Express	2.10	Intel Graphics Media Accelerator 4500MHD with 128-1341 MB						P505-ST5800
P50-AST2NX1		Intel Core i5-4200U with Intel Turbo Boost Technology 2.0		2.60	Mobile Intel HD Graphics						P50-AST2NX1
P50-AST2NX2		Intel Core i7-4700MQ	Mobile Intel HM86 Express	3.40	Mobile Intel HD Graphics						P50-AST2NX2
P50T-BST2GX2		Intel Core i7-4710HQ	Mobile Intel HM86 Express	3.50	AMD Radeon R9 M265X with 2 GB VRAM						P50T-BST2GX2
P50T-BST2GX3		Intel Core i7-4700HQ	Mobile Intel HM86 Express	3.40	AMD Radeon R9 M265X with 2 GB VRAM						P50T-BST2GX3
P50T-BST2GX5		Intel Core i7-4720HQ	Mobile Intel HM86 Express	3.60	AMD Radeon R9 M265X with 2 GB VRAM						P50T-BST2GX5
P55-A5104SL		Intel Core i7-4700MQ	Mobile Intel HM86 Express	3.40	NVIDIA GeForce GT 740M @ 2 GB						P55-A5104SL
P55-A5200		Intel Core i5-3337U	Mobile Intel HM76 Express	2.70	Mobile Intel HD Graphics @ 64-1760 MB						P55-A5200
P55-A5312		Intel Core i5-4200U		2.60	Mobile Intel HD Graphics with up to 1792 MB						P55-A5312
P55T-A5105SL		Intel Core i7-4700MQ	Mobile Intel HM86 Express	3.40	NVIDIA GeForce GT 740M @ 2 GB DDR						P55T-A5105SL
P55T-A5202		Intel Core i5-4200U	Mobile Intel HM86 Express	2.60	Mobile Intel HD Graphics with up to 1792 MB						P55T-A5202
P70-ABT3G22		Intel Core i5-4200M	Mobile Intel HM86 Express	3.10	NVIDIA GeForce GT 740M with NVIDIA Optimus technology @ 2 GB GDDR3						P70-ABT3G22
P70-ABT3N22		Intel Core i5-4200M	Mobile Intel HM86 Express	3.10	Mobile Intel HD Graphics						P70-ABT3N22
P70-AST3NX3		Intel Core i7-4700MQ	Mobile Intel HM86 Express	3.40	Mobile Intel HD Graphics						P70-AST3NX3
P740-BT4G22		Intel Core i5-2450M	Mobile Intel HM65 Express	2.50	NVIDIA GeForce GT 525M with NVIDIA Optimus Technology @ 1 GB GDDR3						P740-BT4G22
P740D-BT4N22		AMD A6-3420M Quad-Core		1.50	AMD Radeon HD 6520G						P740D-BT4N22
P740-ST4N01		Intel Core i5-2410M	Mobile Intel HM65 Express	2.30	Mobile Intel HD Graphics @ 64-1696 MB						P740-ST4N01
P740-ST5GX1		Intel Core i5-2430M	Mobile Intel HM65 Express	2.40 (3.00 with Turbo Boost)	NVIDIA GeForce GT 525M with NVIDIA Optimus Technology @ 1 GB GDDR3						P740-ST5GX1
P740-ST5N01		Intel Core i5-2430M	Mobile Intel HM65 Express	2.40 (3.00 with Turbo Boost)	Mobile Intel HD Graphics @ 64-1696 MB						P740-ST5N01
P740-ST6GX1		Intel Core i5-2450M	Mobile Intel HM65 Express	2.50 (3.10 with Turbo Boost)	NVIDIA GeForce GT 525M with NVIDIA Optimus Technology @ 1 GB GDDR3						P740-ST6GX1
P740-ST6N01		Intel Core i5-2450M	Mobile Intel HM65 Express	2.50 (3.10 with Turbo Boost)	Mobile Intel HD Graphics @ 64-1696 MB						P740-ST6N01
P745D-S4240		AMD A6-3400M Quad-Core		1.40	AMD Radeon HD 6520G						P745D-S4240
P745-S4102		Intel Core i3-2350M	Mobile Intel HM65 Express	2.30	Mobile Intel HD Graphics @ 64-1696 MB						P745-S4102
P745-S4217		Intel Core i5-2410M	Mobile Intel HM65 Express	2.30 (2.90 with Turbo Boost)	Mobile Intel HD Graphics @ 64-1696 MB						P745-S4217
P745-S4250		Intel Core i5-2410M	Mobile Intel HM65 Express	2.30 (2.90 with Turbo Boost)	Mobile Intel HD Graphics @ 64-1696 MB						P745-S4250
P745-S4320		Intel Core i5-2430M	Mobile Intel HM65 Express	2.40 (3.00 with TurboBoost)	Mobile Intel HD Graphics @ 64-1696 MB						P745-S4320
P745-S4360		Intel Core i3-2330M	Mobile Intel HM65 Express	2.20	Mobile Intel HD Graphics @ 64-1696 MB						P745-S4360
P745-S4380		Intel Core i5-2430M	Mobile Intel HM65 Express	2.40 (3.00 with TurboBoost)	Mobile Intel HD Graphics @ 64-1696 MB						P745-S4380
P745-SP4160M		Intel Core i5-2410M	Mobile Intel HM65 Express	2.30 (2.90 with Turbo Boost)	Mobile Intel HD Graphics @ 64-1696 MB						P745-SP4160M
P750D-BT4N22		AMD A6-3400M Quad-Core		1.40 (2.30 with TurboCore)	AMD Radeon HD 6520G						P750D-BT4N22
P750-ST4N01		Intel Core i3-2310M	Mobile Intel HM65 Express	2.10	Mobile Intel HD Graphics @ 64-1696 MB						P750-ST4N01
P750-ST4N02		Intel Core i5-2410M	Mobile Intel HM65 Express	2.30 (2.90 with TurboBoost)	Mobile Intel HD Graphics @ 64-1696 MB						P750-ST4N02
P750-ST4NX1		Intel Core i5-2410M	Mobile Intel HM65 Express	2.30 (2.90 with TurboBoost)	NVIDIA GeForce GT 540M with NVIDIA Optimus Technology @ 1024 MB GDDR3						P750-ST4NX1
P750-ST4NX2		Intel Core i7-2630QM	Mobile Intel HM65 Express	2.00	NVIDIA GeForce GT 540M with NVIDIA Optimus Technology @ 1024 MB GDDR3						P750-ST4NX2
P750-ST5GX1		Intel Core i5-2430M	Mobile Intel HM65 Express	2.40	NVIDIA GeForce GT 540M with NVIDIA Optimus Technology @ 1 GB GDDR3						P750-ST5GX1
P750-ST5N01		Intel Core i3-2330M	Mobile Intel HM65 Express	2.20	Mobile Intel HD Graphics @ 64-1696 MB						P750-ST5N01
P750-ST5N02		Intel Core i5-2430M	Mobile Intel HM65 Express	2.40	Mobile Intel HD Graphics @ 64-1696 MB						P750-ST5N02
P750-ST6GX1		Intel Core i5-2450M	Mobile Intel HM65 Express	2.50	NVIDIA GeForce GT 540M with NVIDIA Optimus Technology @ 1 GB GDDR3						P750-ST6GX1
P750-ST6GX2		Intel Core i7-2670QM	Mobile Intel HM65 Express	2.20	NVIDIA GeForce GT 540M with NVIDIA Optimus Technology @ 1 GB GDDR3						P750-ST6GX2
P755-3DV20		Intel Core i5-2410M	Mobile Intel HM65 Express	2.30 (2.90 with TurboBoost)							P755-3DV20
P755D-S5172		AMD A8-3520M Quad-Core		1.60 (2.50 with Turbo Core)	AMD Radeon HD 6620G						P755D-S5172
P755D-S5266		AMD A6-3400M Quad-Core		2.30	AMD Radeon HD 6520G						P755D-S5266
P755D-S5378		AMD A8-3500M Quad-Core		2.40	AMD Radeon HD 6620G						P755D-S5378
P755D-S5379		AMD A8-3500M Quad-Core		2.40	AMD Radeon HD 6620G						P755D-S5379
P755D-S5384		AMD A8-3500M Quad-Core		2.40	AMD Radeon HD 6620G						P755D-S5384
P755-S5174		Intel Core i5-2450M	Mobile Intel HM65 Express	2.50	Mobile Intel HD Graphics @ 64-1696 MB						P755-S5174
P755-S5196		Intel Core i7-2670QM		2.20							P755-S5196
P755-S5198		Intel Core i7-2670QM		2.20							P755-S5198
P755-S5215		Intel Core i3-2310M		2.10							P755-S5215
P755-S5259		Intel Core i7-2630QM		2.00							P755-S5259
P755-S5260		Intel Core i3-2310M		2.10							P755-S5260
P755-S5261		Intel Core i3-2310M		2.10							P755-S5261
P755-S5262		Intel Core i7-2630QM		2.00							P755-S5262
P755-S5263		Intel Core i5-2410M		2.30							P755-S5263
P755-S5264		Intel Core i5-2410M		2.30							P755-S5264
P755-S5265		Intel Core i5-2410M		2.30							P755-S5265
P755-S5267		Intel Core i7-2630QM		2.00							P755-S5267
P755-S5268		Intel Core i5-2410M		2.30							P755-S5268
P755-S5269		Intel Core i7-2630QM		2.00							P755-S5269
P755-S5270		Intel Core i5-2410M		2.30							P755-S5270
P755-S5272		Intel Core i7-2630QM		2.00							P755-S5272
P755-S5276		Intel Core i7-2630QM		2.00							P755-S5276
P755-S5285		Intel Core i7-2630QM		2.00							P755-S5285
P755-S5320		Intel Core i3-2330M		2.20							P755-S5320
P755-S5375		Intel Core i7-2670QM		2.20							P755-S5375
P755-S5380		Intel Core i5-2430M		2.40							P755-S5380
P755-S5381		Intel Core i5-2430M		2.40							P755-S5381
P755-S5382		Intel Core i5-2430M		2.40							P755-S5382
P755-S5383		Intel Core i7-2670QM		2.20							P755-S5383
P755-S5385		Intel Core i7-2670QM		2.20							P755-S5385
P755-S5387		Intel Core i7-2670QM		2.20							P755-S5387
P755-S5390		Intel Core i7-2670QM		2.20							P755-S5390
P755-S5391		Intel Core i7-2670QM		2.20							P755-S5391
P755-S5392		Intel Core i7-2670QM		2.20							P755-S5392
P755-S5393		Intel Core i7-2670QM		2.20							P755-S5393
P755-S5394		Intel Core i7-2670QM		2.20							P755-S5394
P755-S5395		Intel Core i7-2670QM		2.20							P755-S5395
P755-S5396		Intel Core i7-2670QM		2.20							P755-S5396
P755-S5398		Intel Core i5-2430M		2.40							P755-S5398
P75-A7200		Intel Core i7-4700MQ		3.40							P75-A7200
P770-BT4N22		Intel Core i5-2430M or Core i7-2670QM		2.20–2.40							P770-BT4N22
P770-ST4N01		Intel Core i5-2410M		2.30							P770-ST4N01
P770-ST4NX1		Intel Core i5-2410M		2.30							P770-ST4NX1
P770-ST4NX2		Intel Core i7-2630QM		2.00							P770-ST4NX2
P770-ST5N01		Intel Core i5-2430M		2.40							P770-ST5N01
P770-ST6GX1		Intel Core i5-2450M		2.50							P770-ST6GX1
P770-ST6GX2		Intel Core i7-2670QM		2.20							P770-ST6GX2
P770-ST6N01		Intel Core i5-2450M		2.50							P770-ST6N01
P775D-S7144		AMD A8-3520M Quad-Core		1.60 (2.50 with Turbo Core)	AMD Radeon HD 6620G						P775D-S7144
P775D-S7230		AMD A6-3400M Quad-Core		2.30	AMD Radeon HD 6520G						P775D-S7230
P775D-S7302		AMD A6-3400M Quad-Core		2.30	AMD Radeon HD 6520G						P775D-S7302
P775D-S7360		AMD A8-3500M Quad-Core		2.40	AMD Radeon HD 6620G						P775D-S7360
P775-S7164		Intel Core i7-2670QM	Mobile Intel HM65 Express	2.20 (3.10 with TurboBoost)	Mobile Intel HD Graphics @ 64-1696 MB						P775-S7164
P775-S7165		Intel Core i7-2670QM	Mobile Intel HM65 Express	2.20 (3.10 with TurboBoost)	Mobile Intel HD Graphics @ 64-1696 MB						P775-S7165
P775-S7215		Intel Core i7-2630QM	Mobile Intel HM65 Express	2.00 (2.90 with TurboBoost)	Mobile Intel HD Graphics @ 64-1696 MB						P775-S7215
P775-S7232		Intel Core i5-2410M	Mobile Intel HM65 Express	2.30 (2.90 with TurboBoost)	Mobile Intel HD Graphics @ 64-1696 MB						P775-S7232
P775-S7234		Intel Core i5-2410M	Mobile Intel HM65 Express	2.30 (2.90 with TurboBoost)	NVIDIA GeForce GT540M with NVIDIA Optimus Technology @ 1 GB GDDR3						P775-S7234
P775-S7236		Intel Core i7-2630QM	Mobile Intel HM65 Express	2.00	Mobile Intel HD Graphics @ 64-1696 MB						P775-S7236
P775-S7238		Intel Core i7-2630QM	Mobile Intel HM65 Express	2.00	Mobile Intel HD Graphics @ 64-1696 MB						P775-S7238
P775-S7320		Intel Core i7-2670QM	Mobile Intel HM65 Express	2.20	Mobile Intel HD Graphics @ 64-1696 MB						P775-S7320
P775-S7365		Intel Core i5-2430M	Mobile Intel HM65 Express	2.40	Mobile Intel HD Graphics @ 64-1696 MB						P775-S7365
P775-S7368		Intel Core i5-2430M	Mobile Intel HM65 Express	2.40	NVIDIA GeForce GT540M with NVIDIA Optimus Technology @ 1 GB GDDR3						P775-S7368
P775-S7370		Intel Core i7-2670QM		2.20							P775-S7370
P775-S7372		Intel Core i7-2670QM		2.20							P775-S7372
P775-S7375		Intel Core i7-2670QM		2.20							P775-S7375
P840-ST2N01		Intel Core i5-3317U		1.70 (2.60 with Turbo Boost)							P840-ST2N01
P840T-ST3N01		Intel Core i5-3317U		2.60							P840T-ST3N01
P840T-ST4N02		Intel Core i7-3537U		3.10							P840T-ST4N02
P845-S4200		Intel Core i5-3317U		1.70							P845-S4200
P845-SP4262SM		Intel Core i5-3317U		1.70							P845-SP4262SM
P845T-S4102		Intel Core i5-3337U		2.70							P845T-S4102
P845T-S4305		Intel Core i3-3217U		1.80							P845T-S4305
P845T-S4310		Intel Core i5-3317U		2.60							P845T-S4310
P850-BT2G22		Intel Core i7-3610QM		2.30 (3.30 with Turbo Boost)							P850-BT2G22
P850-BT3G22		Intel Core i3-3120M		2.50							P850-BT3G22
P855-S5102		Intel Core i5-3230		3.20							P855-S5102
P855-S5200		Intel Core i7-3610QM		2.30							P855-S5200
P855-S5312		Intel Core i5-3210		3.10							P855-S5312
P855-SP5261SM		Intel Core i7-3610QM		2.30							P855-SP5261SM
P870-BT3G22		Intel Core i7-3630QM		3.40							P870-BT3G22
P870-BT3N22		Intel Core i7-3630QM		3.40							P870-BT3N22
P870-ST4GX1		Intel Core i7-3630QM		3.40							P870-ST4GX1
P870-ST4NX1		Intel Core i7-3630QM		3.40							P870-ST4NX1
P875-S7200		Intel Core i5-3210M		2.50							P875-S7200
P875-S7310		Intel Core i7-3630QM		3.40							P875-S7310
