= P600 =

P600 may refer to:

- P600 (neuroscience), an event-related potential or peak in electrical brain activity measured by electroencephalography
- P600 NEMA contact ratings, the contact rating of smaller NEMA contactors and relays
- Sendo P600, a model of mobile phone manufactured by Sendo
- An identifier for Interleukin 13, a cytokine protein
- P600 (mountain), a classification for mountains, used in the British Isles
