= Commodore D9060 =

Family of hard drives

D9060/D9090
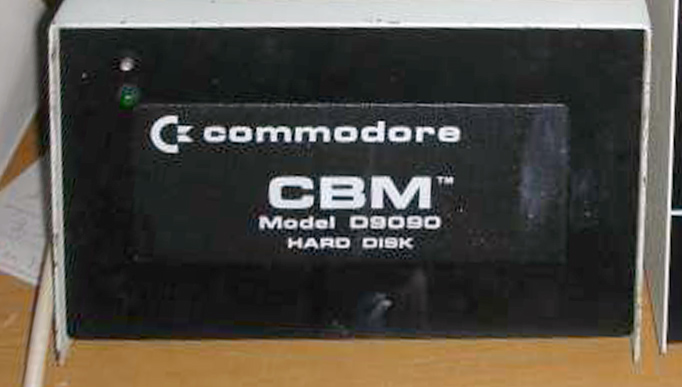
- Commodore D9090 Hard Disk Drive
- Manufacturer: Commodore Business Machines, Inc.
- Type: Hard disk
- Released: 1983 (or earlier)
- Introductory price: £1,995 (equivalent to £6,800 in 2025)
- Media: 5 1/4 in (130 mm) Hard disk
- Storage: 5/7.5 MByte ST-506 MFM
- Connectivity: IEEE-488
- Backward compatibility: Commodore PET, With special interfacing also VIC-20 and Commodore 64

The Commodore D9060/D9090 Hard Disks were the only family of hard drives that Commodore made for both the home and business market. The electronics are identical in the D9060 and the larger D9090 unit; the only difference is the size of the installed hard drive, with a jumper set to distinguish between 4 or 6 disk heads. Originally intended for the metal-cased PET/CBM series of computers, they are compatible with the VIC-20, Commodore 64 and later models with an adapter.

== Technical data ==
Model	Mechanism type	RPM	Heads	Cylinders	Sectors	Bytes/sector	Unformatted size	Formatted size	Blocks free	Free
D9060	Tandon TM602S	3600±1%	4	153	32	256	6.4 MB	5.01 MB	19,442	4860.5 KB
D9090	Tandon TM603S	3600±1%	6	153	32	256	9.6 MB	7.52 MB	29,162	7290.5 KB

- on the D9060; 153 Cylinders × 4 Heads × 32 Sectors × 256 Bytes/sector equals 5.01 MB.
- on the D9090; 153 Cylinders × 6 Heads × 32 Sectors × 256 Bytes/sector equals 7.52 MB.

Internally the system was made up of four major parts:

1. CBM DOS 3.0 PCB
2. SASI Controller
3. Hard drive
4. Power supply

Input voltage: 100, 117, 220, 240 V AC

== Power supply ==
4-pin plug & cable - wiring and voltages follow world standard for large drive power cables, but colours are not standard.

Pin	Usage
1	5 V
2	Ground (black)
3	Ground (black)
4	12 V

== CBM DOS 3.0 PCB ==
CBM DOS PCB

This DOS PCB is made up of several major electronic components:

- 3 × ROMs (Two for CBM DOS system & communication with host computer, one for SASI communications for hard drive low level formatting - track & sector layout, 4 or 6 heads.)
- 4 or 6 heads is selectable by a hardware jumper located on the front of the DOS PCB
- 2 × MOS 6502 microprocessors @ 1 MHz
- 2 × 6532 RIOT I/O chips
- 1 × 6522 VIA I/O chip
- 8 × 2114 SRAM chips 4 KB DOS use, system disk buffers
- Commodore device number selectable between 8 - 11 (on IC 7H : 6532)

== SASI controller ==
SASI controller PCB

The main brain driving this controller is the AMD 'AM2910' (a 12-bit address sequencer) The SASI interface was invented by Shugart which would later become Seagate. SASI eventually became standardized and is known today as SCSI.

== Connecting two hard drives to one SASI controller ==
Capable of managing 2 x MFM hard drive mechanisms, which is communicated to the user as two combined directories, with one header number = 0 and the other header number = 1. This is unlike other Commodore drives of this era, which required each separate disk directory to be called individually with a command LOAD"0:$",8 and LOAD"1:$",8 for the two drives that reside in device 8. It appears the DOS was never fully completed by Commodore; this is indicated by the way two directories overlap for the one device and the number of blocks free is displayed as if only one hard drive is in use. The DOS will also "lock up" if an attempt is made to access drive unit 1 when there is just the one hard drive unit connected as drive unit 0.

== Hard drive ==
The inside of a similar ST225-HD hard disk mechanism

The unit uses Tandon TM602S/TM603S hard disk drive units. Tandon was founded in 1975 and became part of Western Digital (WD) in 1988.

Data is encoded to the disk platters using the MFM disk format.

Internally the system had a transfer rate of 5.0 Mbit/s from the hard disk drive to the CBM DOS 3.0 Controller PCB.

Any 4 or 6 head MFM drive mechanism can be used as a replacement mechanism.

Cylinders = 153 (per hard disc) 6 head drive contains 3 platters, 4 head drive contains 2 platters.

Sectors per cylinder = 192 (D9090) (32 sectors × 6 heads)

Sectors per cylinder = 128 (D9060) (32 sectors × 4 heads)

Sectors per track = 32

Bytes per sector = 256

Access time Track-to-Track, Average: 153 ms, 99 ms

Error Rates: Soft Read: 1×10^{10} bits Hard Read: 1×10^{12} bits Seek Errors: 1×10^{6} seeks

Recording density: 7690 BPI (bits per inch)

Transfer speed: 5 Mbit/s

+12V D. C. +/- 10% 1.5 amps typical, 5 amps maximum for 10 seconds with no more than 5 millivolts PARD* +5V D. C. +/- 5% .. 8 amps typical with no more than 50 millivolts PARD*

- Periodic and Random Deviation.

Environmental: Ambient Temperature: Operating: 16 to 46 °C (61 to 115 °F) Nonoperating: −35.4 to 60 °C (−31.7 to 140.0 °F) Relative Humidity: 8% to 80% Maximum Wet Bulb Temperature: 26 °C without condensation

True: 0.0 - 0.4 V Imax=40mA maximum False: 2.5-5.25 V Imax=0mA open

Control signal electrical for single ended signals: 7438 driver into a maximum of 20 feet (6.1 m) cable into a +5V..220 ohm..Signal..330 ohm terminator..GND into a 74LS14 load.

== Formatting ==
Despite the small storage space (by current standards) of these legacy hard drives, formatting either can require a fair amount of patience from the user:

- D9060 (4 heads) Formatting takes approximately 1 hour.
- D9090 (6 heads) Formatting takes approximately 1 hour and 20 minutes.

These long delays can be attributed by the overall operation which consists of the low-level disk format by the SASI controller, followed by a six-pass test pattern write to the whole disk surface by the DOS before placing the initial filing system information.

== Partitions and subdirectories ==
Due to the structure of the onboard DOS 3.0, there is only one main partition which contains the directory and all the saved files. There are no subdirectories so eventually you run into trouble when you type LOAD"$",8 and LIST, the directory list fills the screen and then scrolls away. You can pause the directory listing as with any Commodore computer. But if you have scores or hundreds of files saved, then the user must wait some time until the entire directory listing has finished scrolling.

== Using larger disk mechanisms ==
With minor changes to the CBM DOS ROM code, larger capacity hard disk drives could be swapped into the D9060/D9090 unit. This was done by finding drives with 8 heads (4 platters) and 256 cylinders. The CBM DOS would support these numbers if "hard coded" into the ROM. Nothing larger could be accommodated without major changes to the drive code. In the 1980s, an Arizona company named Copperstate Cash Register was selling upgraded units to the business and BBS operator community.

Model	Mechanism type	RPM	Heads	Cylinders	Sectors	Bytes/sector	Actual	Formatted size	Blocks free	Free
D9060-modified	Unknown	3600	8	256	32	256	16.8 MB	~12.0 MB	Unknown	Unknown

- 256 Cylinders × 8 Heads × 32 Sectors × 256 Bytes/sector equals 16.8 MB.

== IEEE–488 bus ==
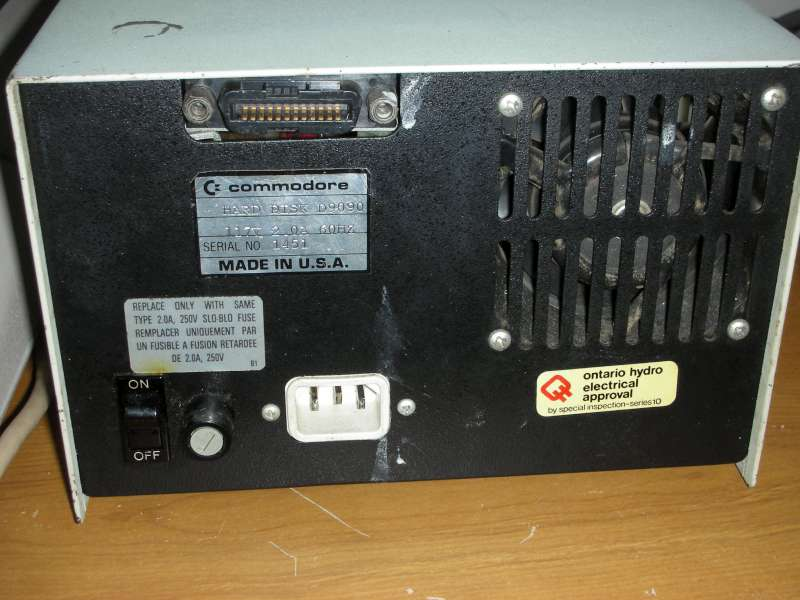
The back of a D9090 drive showing the IEEE–488 port

The drive used the IEEE–488 interface (a 24 wire parallel cable) to communicate with computers, which was also known as both the General Purpose Interface Bus (GPIB) and the Hewlett-Packard Interface Bus (HP-IB). The transfer rate was 1.2 kB per second from the D9060/D9090. These hard drives could be daisy chained on the interface with each device using a different device number.

The D9060/D9090 were designed for use on the Commodore CBM/PET family of computers, but because this metal-cased family of computers was made obsolete by the VIC-20 and the Commodore 64, the greatest demand for these drives came from VIC-20, C64 and C128 users. As a result, several companies built interfaces that effectively give a VIC-20 and Commodore 64/128 an IEEE-488 port. The first produced was the VIC-20 IEEE 488 cartridge, model number "VIC-1112", produced by Commodore.

Commodore 64 IEEE-488 interface cartridges were made by various companies. The original Commodore 64/128 IEEE Cartridge was produced later and were packaged with SFD-1001 disk drives in Europe only, which was why this unit was unknown in the U.S.

VIC-1112 cartridge (internal view) used with the VIC-20 computer

Quicksilver 64/128 by Skyles Electric Works

Quicksilver 64/128 v2 PCB+

Computapix IEEE Cartridge

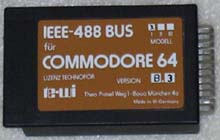
Technofor

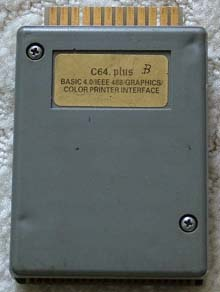
C64-Plus

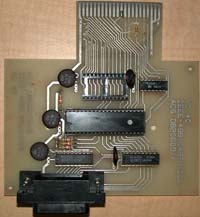
VC40 Cartridge

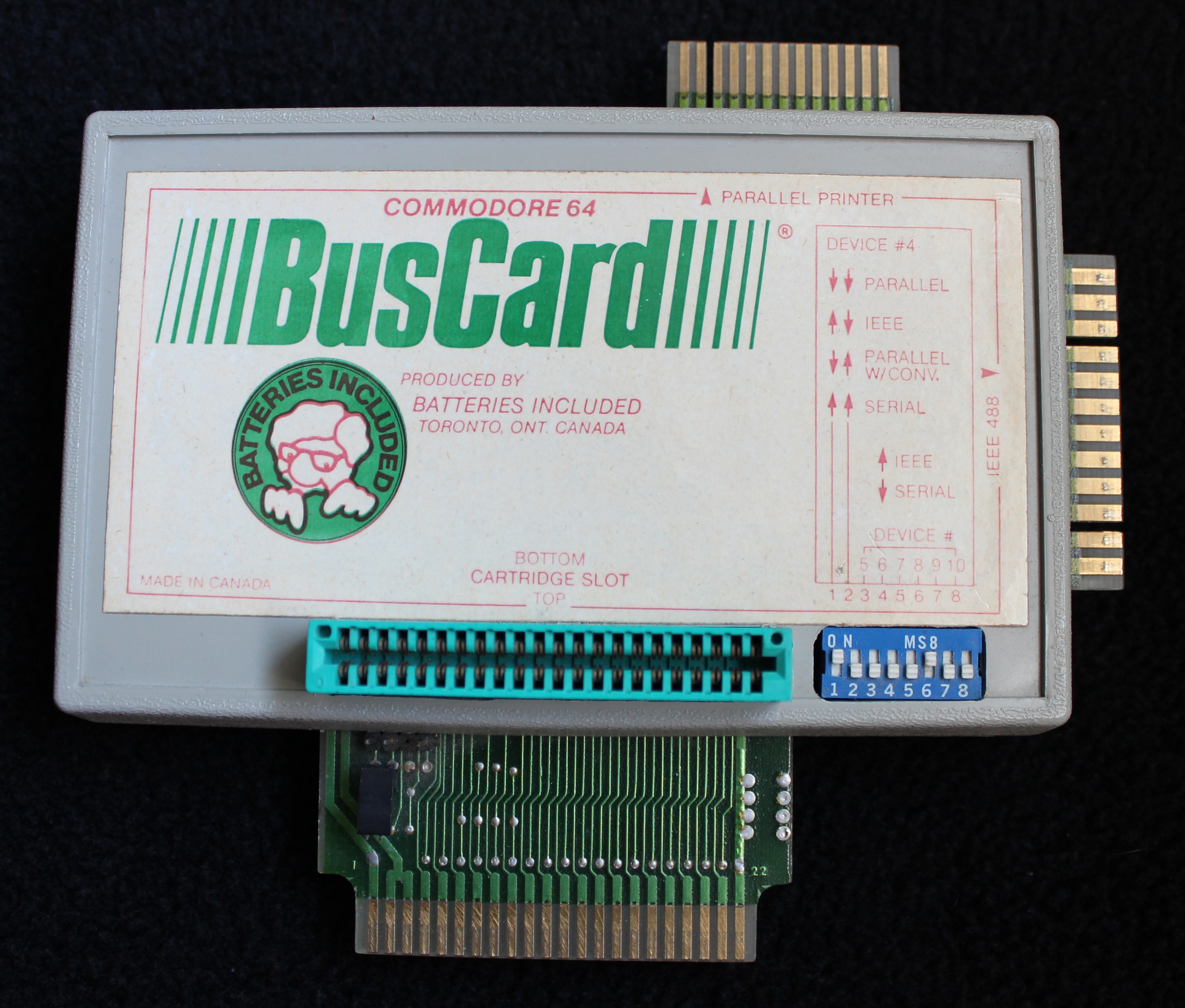
Batteries Included - Buscard II Interface.
- Batteries Included - Buscard II Interface. (contains a 6532 RIOT, 6821 (PIA) and 8 KB ROM, and a 256 byte PROM)

Some other interfaces without pictures available:

- E-LINK Serial to IEEE Interface. (contains 65C02, 6522 and 4 KB ROM)
- INTERPOD - A standalone interface box, that connects the CBM (IEC) serial to parallel IEEE-488 and serial RS-232. It uses the 6502 CPU, 6532 RIOT, 6522 VIA, 6850 ACIA and 4 KB 2716 EPROM chips.
- MSD VIE ("VIC20 - 488") - 4 KB 2716 EPROM 6522 VIA, 75160A & 75161A IEEE drivers.
- MSD CEI ("C64 - 488") - 4 KB 2716 EPROM 6526 CIA, 75160A & 75161A IEEE drivers.
- Richvale Telecommunications (RTC) - C64-LINK - 6821 PIA, EPROM
- Richvale Telecommunications (RTC) - C64-LINK II - 6821 PIA, EPROM

== Commodore 64/128 usage ==
The D9060 & D9090 hard drives were highly sought after in the early 1980s by people using the Commodore 64 and Commodore 128 who wanted to taste the luxury of having all their utilities and games in one place. Files and games loaded 5 times faster than the common Commodore 1541 floppy disk drive. Many bulletin board systems (BBS) were set up using these hard drives as they could access information quickly and could hold massively more information compared to the 1541 disk drive which could only access 170 KB on one side of a floppy disk at one time.

By the late 1980s, the Commodore 64 had obsoleted all other Commodore 8-bit machines mainly because of the sheer number of users worldwide and also the market support from so many 3rd party software & hardware companies. As a result, the older IEEE-488 disk drives and hard drives were being acquired by large numbers of C64 owners to connect to their computer using an IEEE-488 Interface. This has put pressure on the supply of these devices as nowadays they are wanted by both Commodore 64/128 users and also needed by people using the PET family of machines, that these drives were specifically designed for.

== Price when new ==
The oldest pricing reference found for this article was titled "Commodore Price List 1-september 1983"

- D9060 Hard Disk Drive 5 Megabytes = $4,648 (Australia), £1,995 (UK)
- D9090 Hard Disk Drive 7.5 Megabytes = $5,813 (Australia), £2,495 (UK)
