= Commodore 8050 =

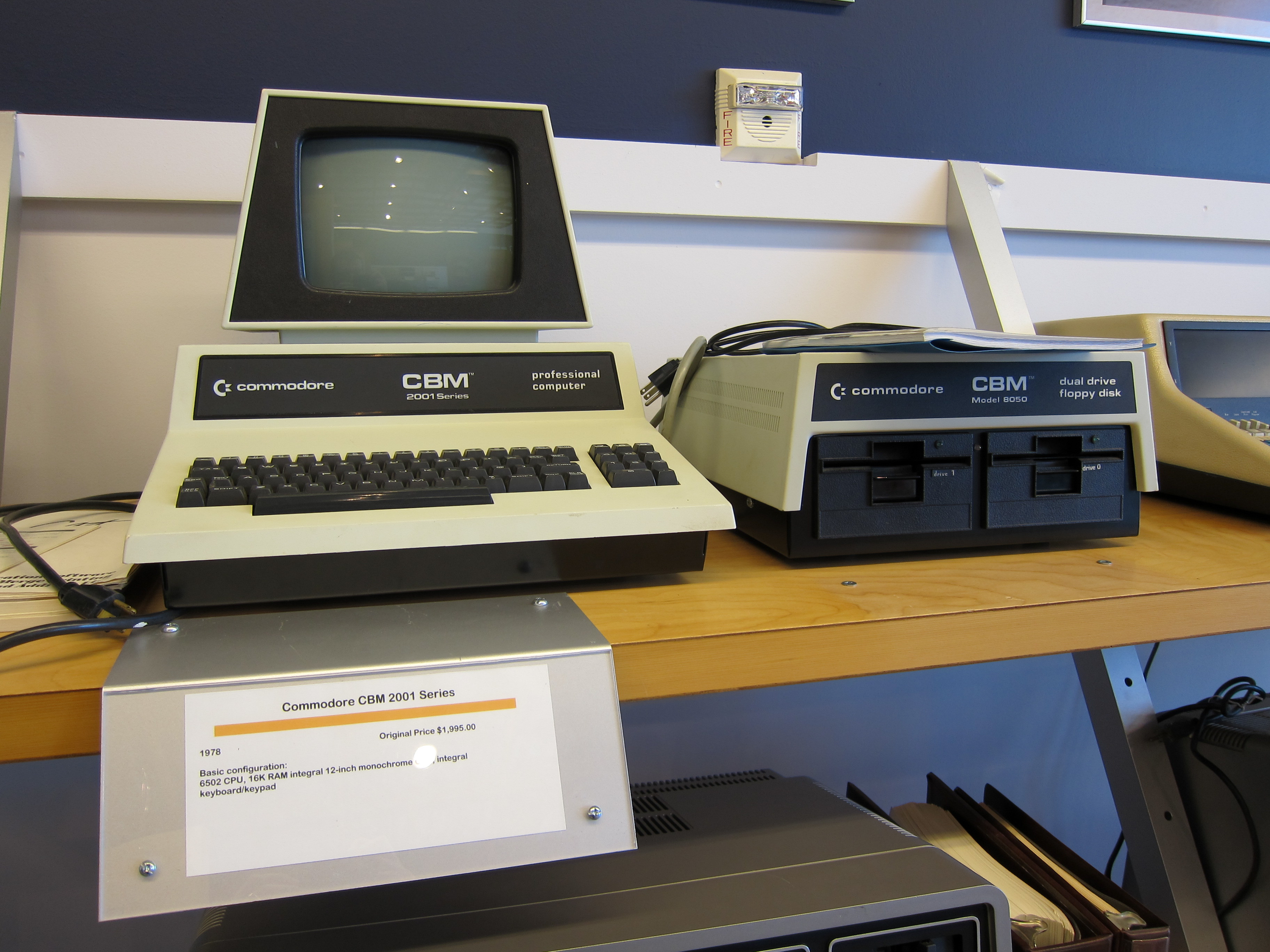
- Commodore 8050 floppy-disk drive, with CBM 2001 PC
- Manufacturer: Commodore Business Machines, Inc.
- Type: Floppy drive
- Released: 1980
- Introductory price: US$1,695 (equivalent to $6,600 in 2025)
- Media: 2 × 5¼" double-sided, double-density
- Operating system: CBM DOS 2.5/2.7
- CPU: 2 × MOS 6502 @ 1 MHz
- Memory: 4 KB SRAM (8 × 2114), 16 KB ROM (2 × 2364)
- Storage: 521 KB/side, 1042 KB/disk
- Connectivity: Parallel IEEE-488
- Power: 110-117 V, 220-240 V, 50 W
- Dimensions: 6.5 in × 15.0 in × 14.35 in (165 mm × 381 mm × 364 mm)
- Weight: 28 lb (13 kg)
- Backward compatibility: PET, 4000-series, 8000-series, B128; Commodore 64, VIC-20 with IEEE-488 adapter
- Predecessor: Commodore 4040

The Commodore 8050, Commodore 8250, and Commodore SFD-1001 are 5¼-inch floppy disk drives manufactured by Commodore International, primarily for its 8-bit CBM and PET series of computers. The drives offered improved storage capacities over previous Commodore drive models.

They are notable for the disk drive having twice the processing power than the connected computer in having two 1MHz 6502 processors sharing operation of communication and disk operation, though only supporting 4k of main memory. The disk operating system is actually contained within the disk drive unit with commands being sent via the 8 bit GPIB interface where the system decodes the message and carries out the requested operation such as formatting a disk without further involvement from the connected computer.

== Specifications ==
All three models utilize 5¼-inch double-density floppy disks with a track spacing of 100 tracks-per-inch, for a total of 77 logical tracks per side. (Note: 5¼-inch double-density drives with a track spacing of 96 or 100 tpi are commonly referred to as "quad-density" drives.) Data is encoded using Commodore's proprietary group coded recording scheme. Soft sectoring is used for track alignment. Like most other Commodore disk drives, these drives utilize zone bit recording to maintain an average bit density across the entire disk. Formatted capacity is approximately 0.5 megabyte per side, or 1 megabyte (1,066,496 bytes) in 4166 blocks total.

The 8050 is a single-sided drive, whereas the 8250 and SFD-1001 are double-sided drives. Double-sided drives can fully read and write to disks formatted by single-sided drives, but single-sided drives can only read and write to the bottom side of disks formatted by double-sided drives.

Both the 8050 and 8250 are housed in a dual-drive case similar to the Commodore 4040 drive. The SFD-1001 is housed in a single-drive case similar to the Commodore 1541. The 8250LP, a low-profile revision of the 8250, is housed in a shorter dual-drive case that is stylistically similar to the SFD-1001. All models include an internal power supply and an IEEE-488 data connector on the rear of the case. The 8050 and 8250 include latch sensors that can detect when a disk is inserted or removed.

These drives are not dual-mode, so they cannot read or write 5¼-inch disks formatted by lower-capacity 48-tpi models, such as the Commodore 1541 or 4040. They also cannot read or write 5¼-inch disks formatted by 96-tpi drives, such as the 640 kilobyte IBM PC disk or 880 kilobyte Commodore Amiga disk, due to the minor difference in track spacing. Lastly, they cannot read or write high-density 5¼-inch disks due to both the difference in track spacing and the difference in write head coercivity (300-oersted for double-density, 600-oersted for high-density).

== Disk Layout ==
Track	Sectors Per Track (256 bytes)	Sectors
1-39, 78-116	29	1131
40-53, 117-130	27	378
54-64, 131-141	25	275
65-77, 142-154	23	299

Total Sectors: 2083 (4166 for the 8250)

The disk header is on 39/0 (track 39, sector 0), with the directory residing on the remaining 28 sectors of track 39.

Header Layout 39/0

$00–01 T/S reference to the first BAM (block availability map) sector
    02 DOS version ('C')
 06-16 Disk label, $A0 padded
 18-19 Disk ID
 1B-1C DOS type('2C')

The BAM (block availability map) begins on 38/0 (track 38, sector 0), and continues on 38/3. On the 8250, the BAM extends further to 38/6 and 38/9. The remaining sectors on track 38 are available for general use.

BAM Layout 38/0, 3, (6, 9)

$00–01 T/S reference to the next BAM sector, or 00/FF if last.
    02 DOS version ('C')
    04 Lowest BAM track in this block
    05 Highest+1 BAM track in this block
 06-FF BAM for 50 tracks

== See also ==
- List of floppy disk formats
- Zone bit recording
- Group coded recording
