= P400 =

P400 may refer to:

- P400 class patrol vessel
- P-400, the export model of P-39 Airacobra fighter
