= Commodore 65 =

Prototype computer

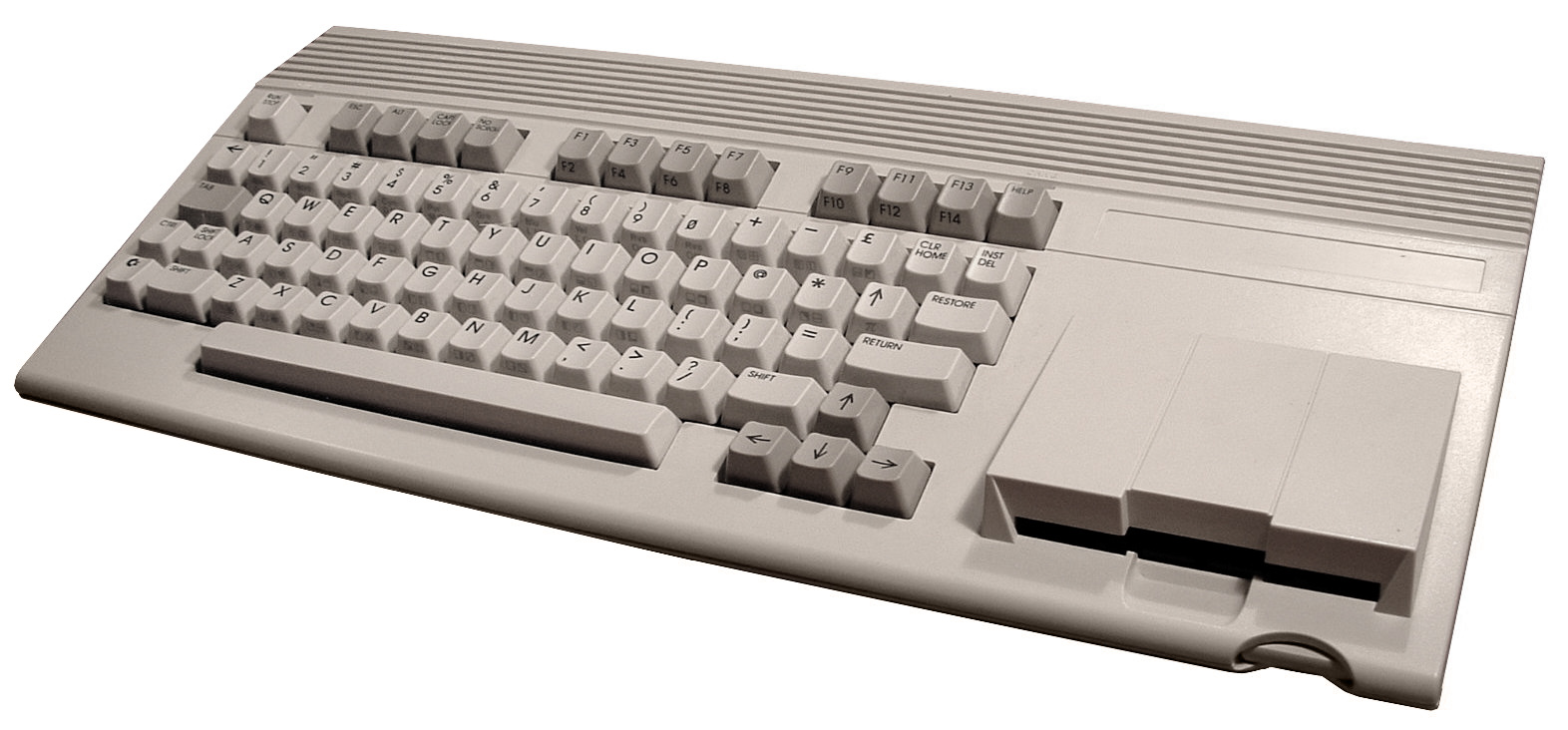
- Type: Personal computer
- Released: N/A
- Discontinued: 1991 (prototype cancelled)
- Units shipped: 50 to 2000 units
- Operating system: Commodore BASIC 10.0
- CPU: CSG 4510 R3 @ 3.54 MHz
- Memory: 128 KB (8 MB maximum)
- Removable storage: 3½" DSDD floppy disk drive
- Display: 320×200×256; 640×200×16; 640×400×16; 1280×200×4; 1280×400×4; palette of 4096 colors
- Graphics: VIC-III (CSG 4567 R5)
- Sound: Two CSG 8580R5 SID
- Predecessor: Commodore 64

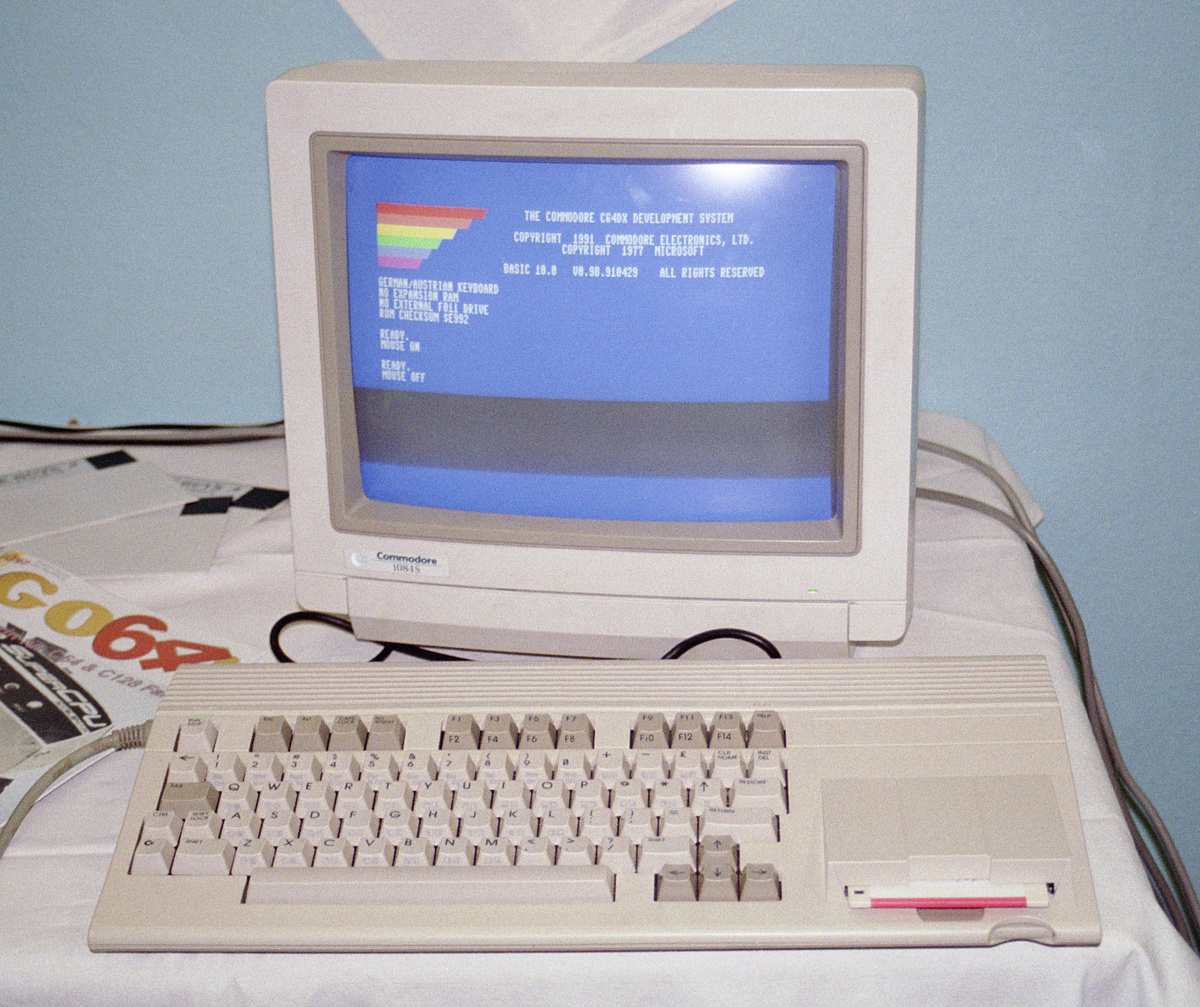
A Commodore 65 prototype

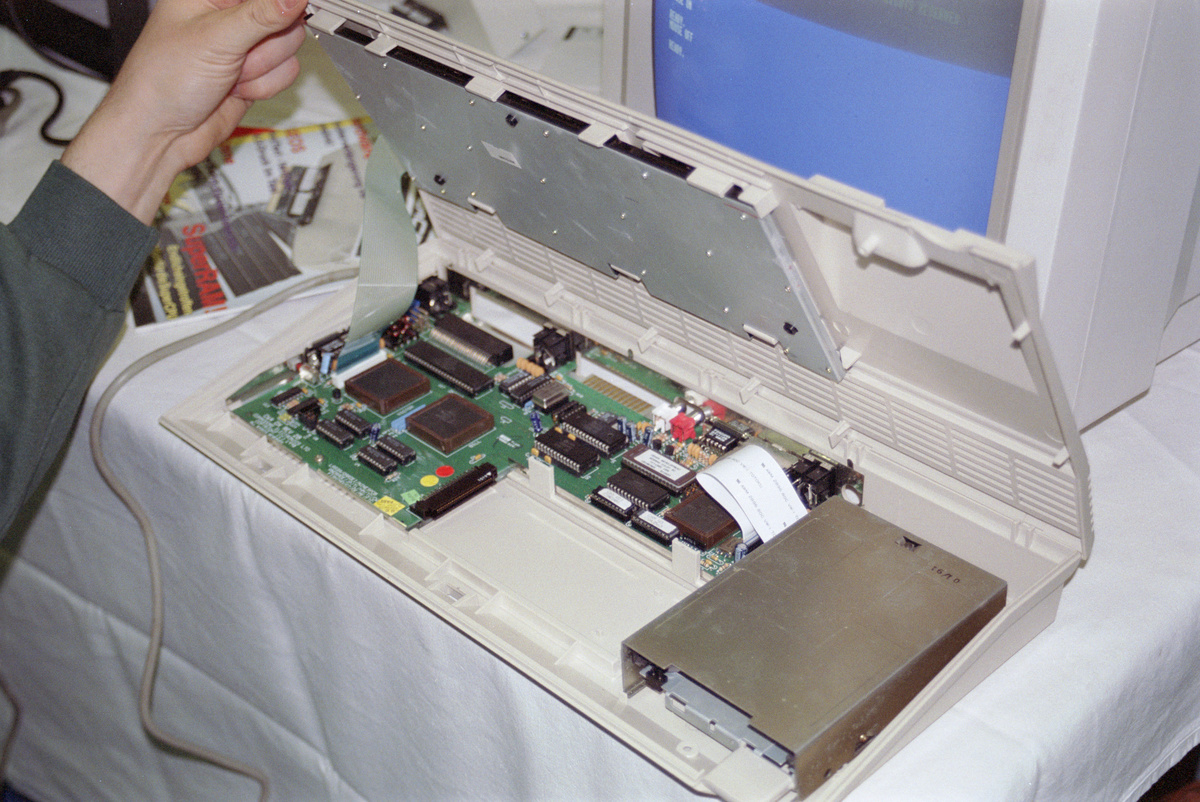
Commodore 65 opened up, revealing its internal disk drive

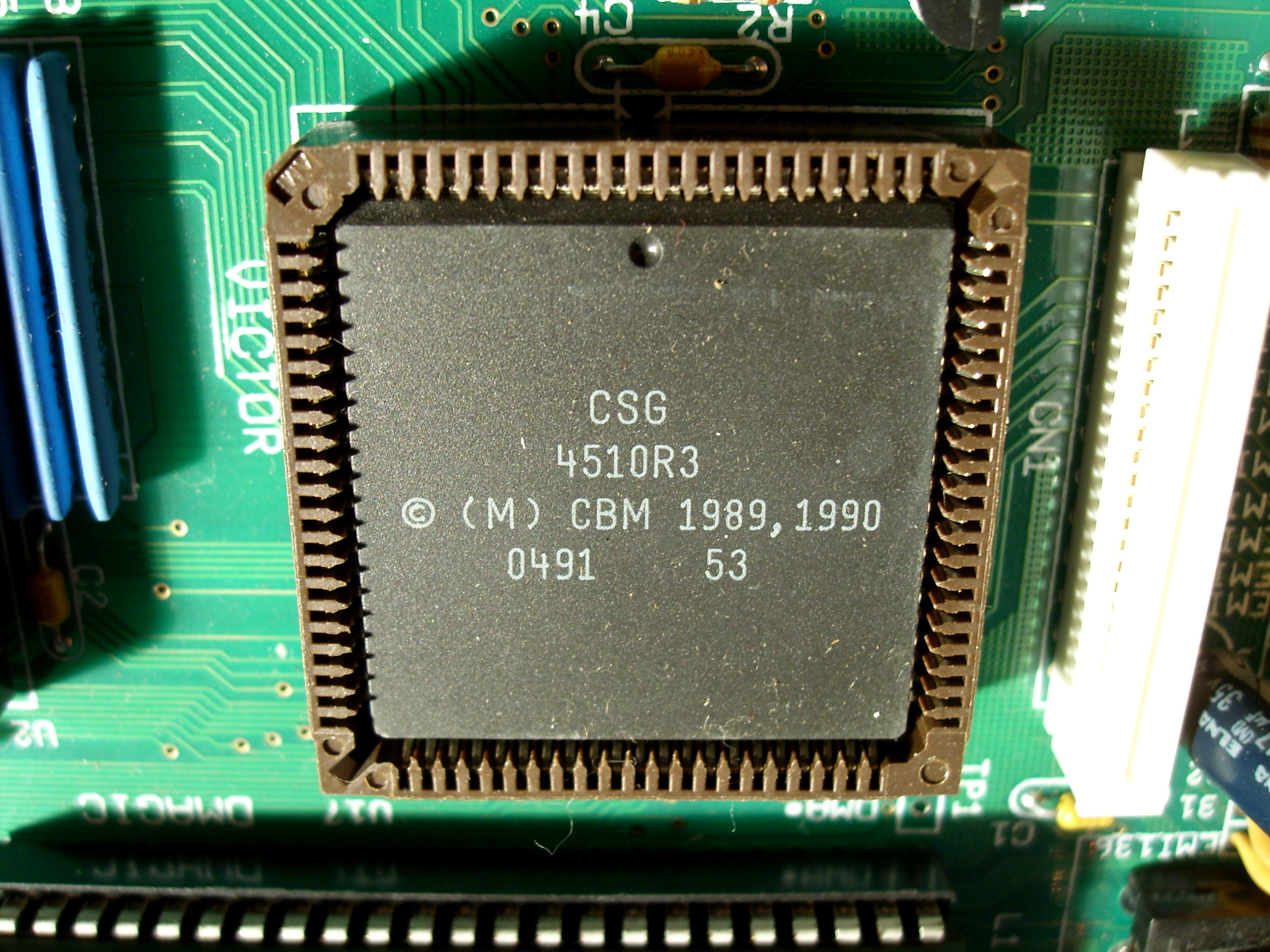
CSG 4510 ("Victor")

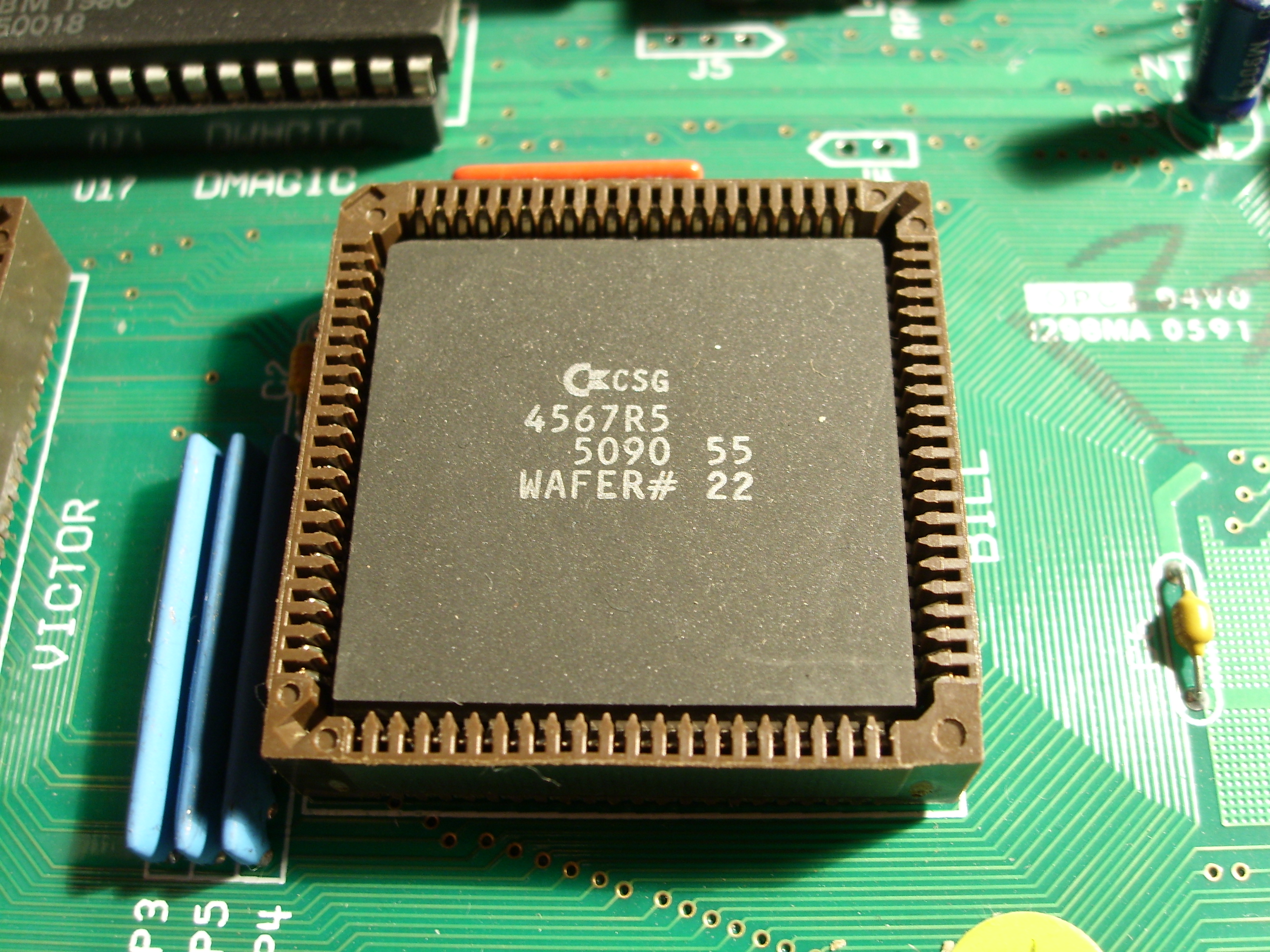
CSG 4567 ("Bill")

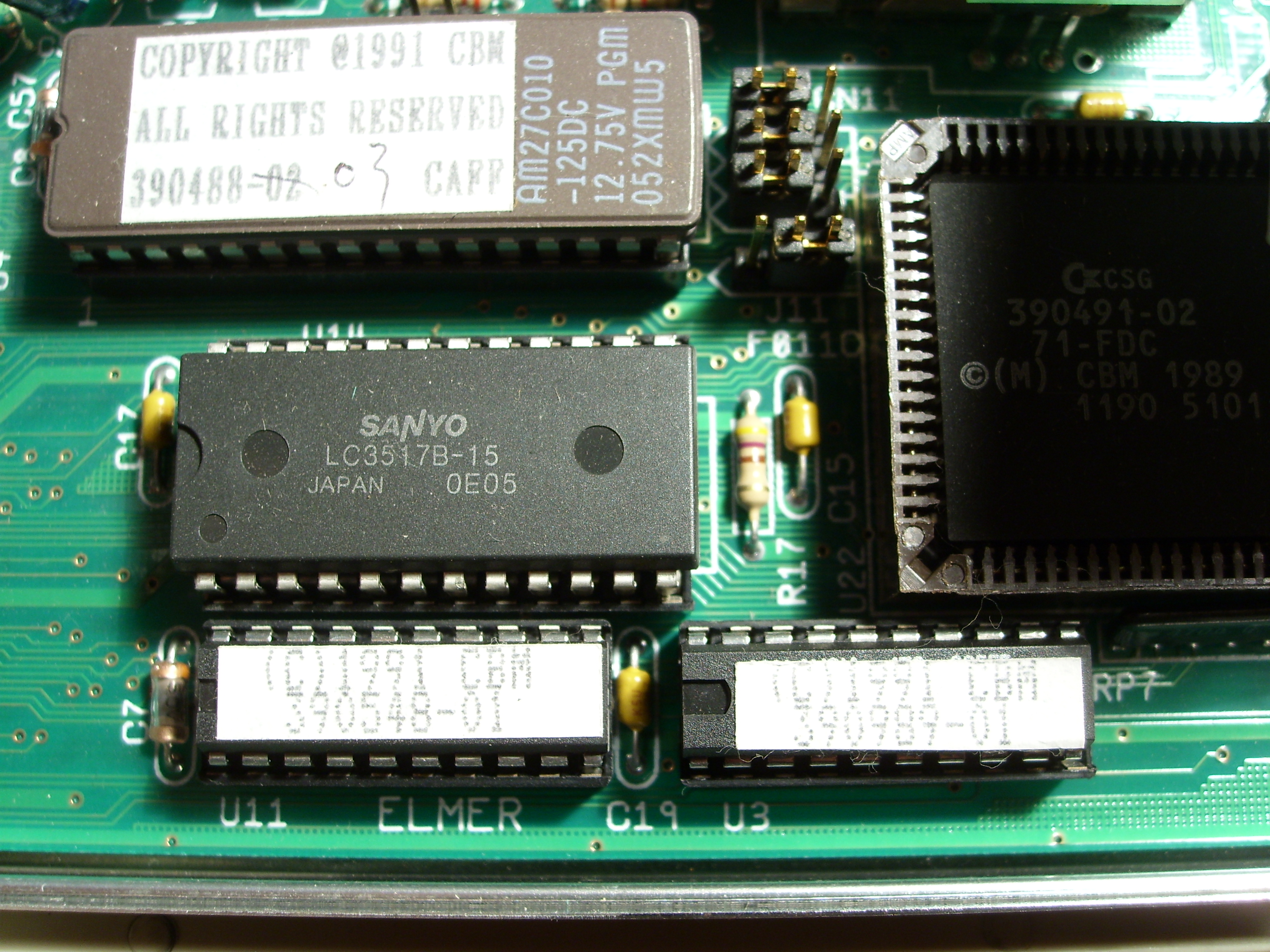
"Elmer" and "Igor" (programmable logic)

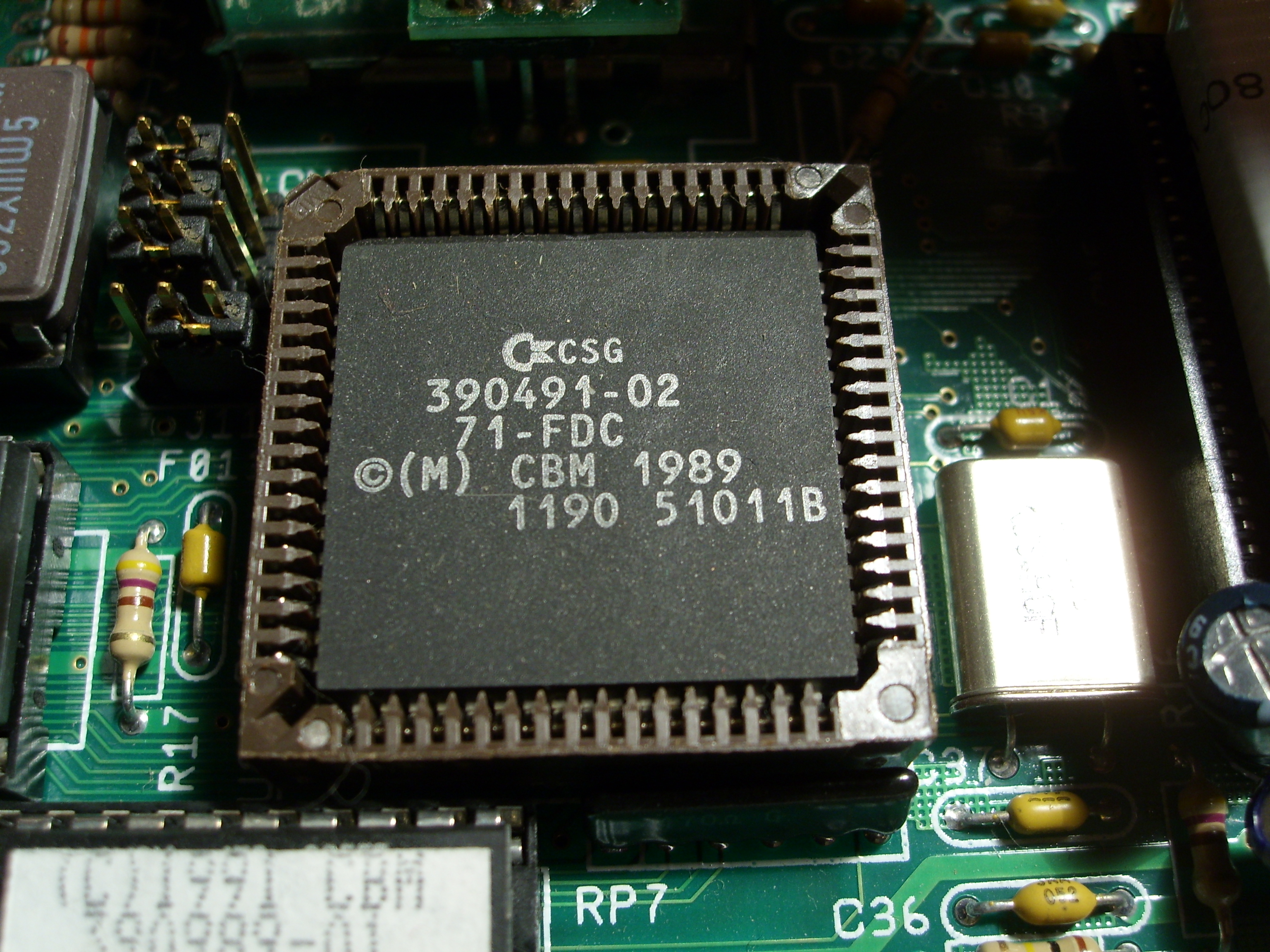
F011B (floppy disk controller)

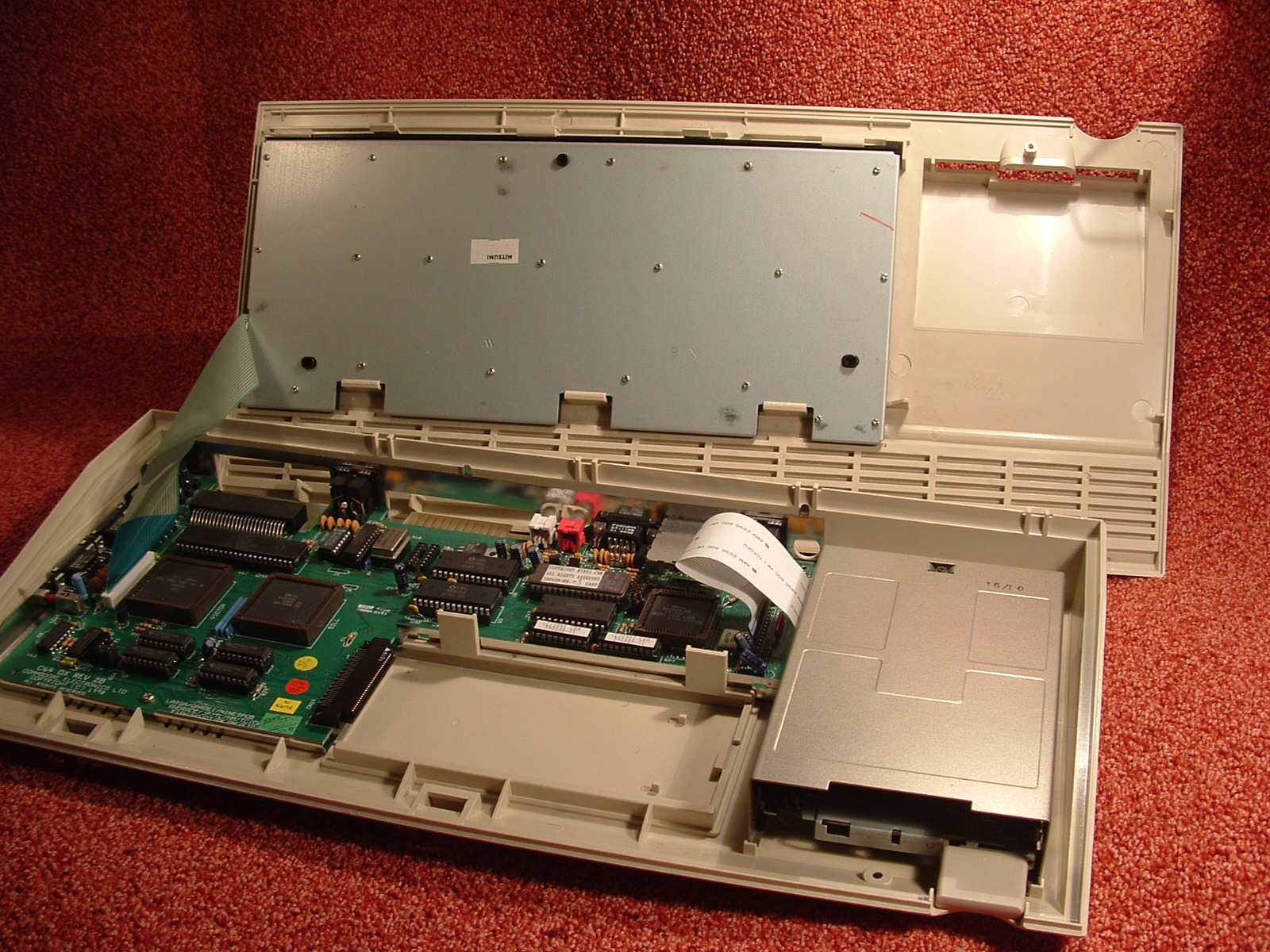
Opened chassis

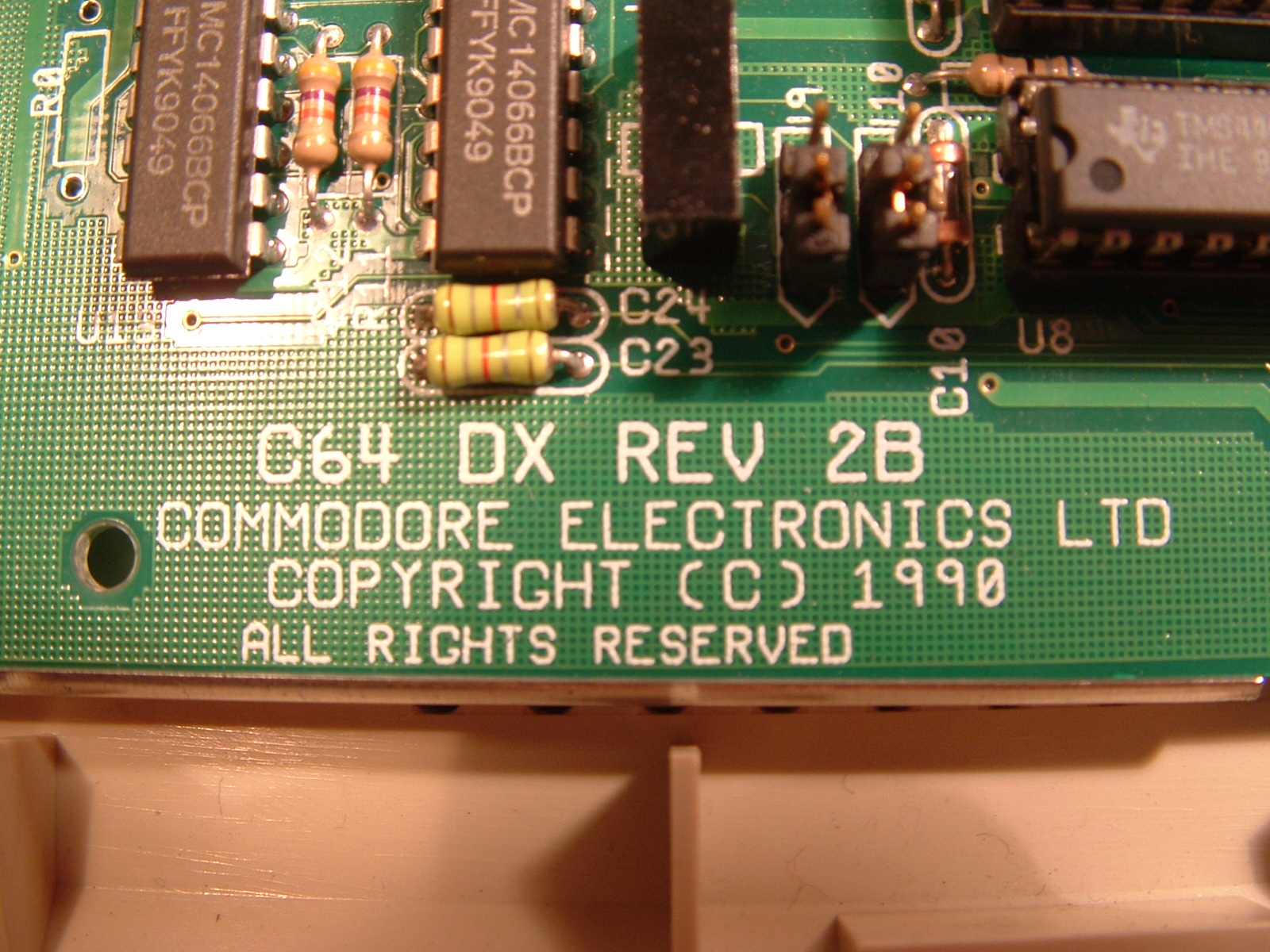
Motherboard inscription

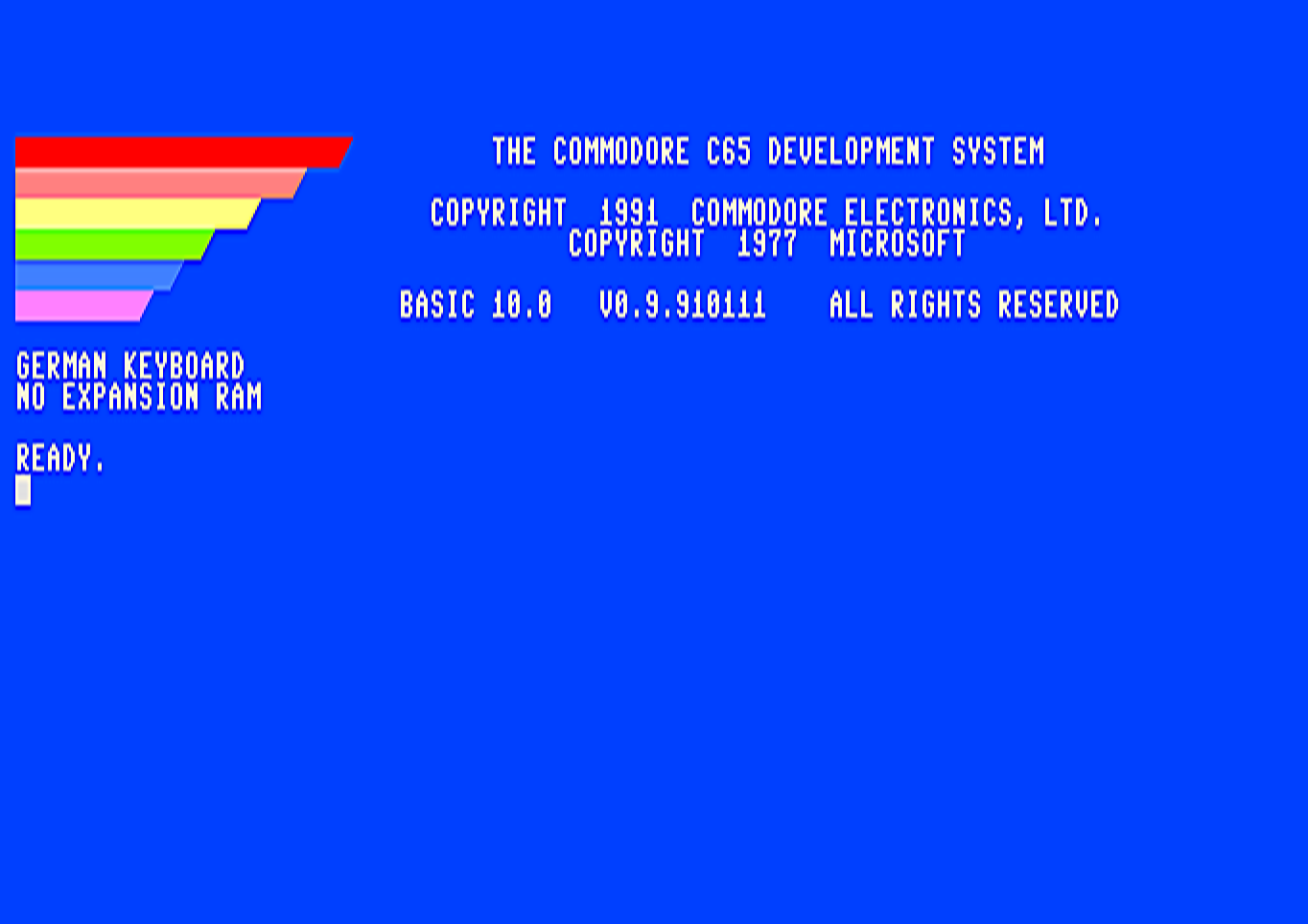
Start screen

The Commodore 65 (also known as the C64DX) is a prototype computer created at Commodore Business Machines in 1990–1991. It is an improved version of the Commodore 64, and it was meant to be backwards-compatible with the older computer, while still providing a number of advanced features close to those of the Amiga.

== History ==
In September 1989 Compute!'s Gazette wrote that "Sales of the 64 have diminished rapidly, Nintendo has eaten big holes in the market, and the life of the old warhorse computer should somehow be extended". Noting that Apple developed the IIGS to extend the life of the Apple II line, the magazine asked "Will Commodore take the same tack?", then continued:

The latest rumor says Yes. We've heard reports from several sources of a new machine from Commodore—A 64GS, if you will. This machine is reportedly driven by a GE802, a version of the 65816 microprocessor (which is a 16-bit version of the 6502 chip), and runs at 4 MHz (by comparison, the 64 runs at 1 MHz; the Amiga, at slightly over 7 MHz). It comes with 128K of RAM and is expandable to one megabyte. Fully expanded, it supports 256 colors. Maximum resolution is a stunning 640 X 400 pixels. We've also heard that it has a 64 mode so that 64 owners can purchase a much more powerful machine and still use their software library. The 64GS reportedly comes with a built-in 3 1/2-inch disk drive and will support the 1581. But, our sources say, it does not support the 1541 or the 1571 drive (uh, excuse me, please pass the bologna). All we've heard about sound in the new machine is that it's "enhanced" and features stereo output. The final tidbit is that the 64GS will retail in the $300-$350 range when it debuts in November.

The Gazette added, "Our sources also report that there is a great deal of infighting at Commodore as to whether the machine should be released. The sales staff wants to get the machine out the door, while the naysaying engineers have dubbed it 'son of Plus/4.'" While the next issue reported that "the latest rumor is that such a machine will never see the light of day", Fred Bowen and others at Commodore in 1990–1991 developed the Commodore 65 (C65) as a successor to the C64. In the end of 1990 the decision to create the C65 was taken. The project was cancelled by Commodore's chairman Irving Gould in 1991.

When Commodore International was liquidated in 1994, an estimated 50–2000 prototypes were sold on the open market. The final 8-bit model from CBM remained the triple-mode, 1–2 MHz, 128 KB, Commodore 128 of 1985.

== Technical specifications ==
- The CPU named CSG 4510 R3 is a custom CSG 65CE02 (a MOS 6502 derivative), combined with two MOS 6526 complex interface adapters (CIAs), a UART serial interface, and a memory mapper to allow for an addressable space of 1 MB
- 3.54 MHz clock frequency (the C64 runs at 1 MHz)
- A new VIC-III graphics chip named CSG 4567 R5, capable of producing 256 colors from a palette of 4096 colors; available modes include 320×200×256 (8), 640×200×16 (4), 640×400×16 (4), 1280×200×4 (2), and 1280×400×4 (2) ( X×Y×color depth, i.e. number of colors (bit planes) )
  - Supports all video modes of VIC-II
  - Text mode with 40/80 × 25 characters
  - Synchronizable with external video source (genlock)
  - Integrated DMA controller (bit blit)
- Two CSG 8580R5 SID sound chips producing stereo sound (the C64 has one SID)
  - Separate control (left / right) for volume, filter and modulation
- 128 KB RAM, expandable with up to 1 MB using a RAM expansion port similar to that of the Commodore Amiga 500
- 128 KB ROM
- Heavily improved BASIC: Commodore BASIC 10.0 (the C64 has the relatively feature-weak BASIC 2.0, which was almost 10 years old by this time.)
- One internal 3½" DSDD floppy disk drive
- Keyboard with 77 keys and an inverted T directional cursor block

=== Ports ===
Left side:

- Power +5 V DC at 2.2 A and +12 V DC at 0.85 A
- 2× Control ports DE9M

Back:

- Expansion port 50-pin
- CBM-488 bus using a 6-pin DIN for 1541/1571/1581
- User port: parallel 24-pin (without 9 V AC)
- Stereo 2× RCA connector for left and right channel
- RGBA video DE9F
- RF video
- Composite video 8-pin DIN
- External fast floppy drive port — mini-DIN-8

Bottom flap:

- RAM expansion

Dimensions: ≈46 cm wide, 20 cm deep, 5.1 cm high (18.1 inches wide, 7.9 inches deep, 2 inches high)

=== Chipset names ===
The custom chips of the C65 were not meant to have names like the custom chips in the Amiga. Although there are names printed near the chip sockets on various revisions of the circuit board, they were not intended as names for the chips. According to former Commodore engineer Bill Gardei,

The Legend on the PCB was to let others in the organization know [whom] to go to for advice on the chips. We did have an issue with that. But that wasn't the name of the chip at the time. The 4567 was always called the VIC-3. I can see why others outside of Commodore made the connection. But again—no—we never called these chips "Victor" or "Bill".

The custom chips for the C65 are:

- CSG 4510: processor (commonly called "Victor" after Victor Andrade)
- CSG 4567: VIC-III graphics processor (commonly called "Bill" after Bill Gardei)
- CSG 4151: DMAgic DMA controller (designed by Paul Lassa)
- F011C: FDC (floppy disk controller, also designed by Bill Gardei)

The C65 also contains one or two programmable logic arrays depending on the version:

- ELMER: PAL16L8 (C65 versions 1.1, 2A, 2B), PAL20L8 (C65 versions 3–5)
- IGOR: PAL16L8 (C65 version 2B only)

=== Graphics subsystem ===
The main memory of the C65 is shared between the graphics subsystem and the CPU. The memory clock runs at almost twice the speed of the C64. To further increase the bandwidth of the graphics subsystem, the memory is divided into 2× 8-bit wide banks of 64 Kbyte which can be accessed by the CSG-4567 simultaneously. This provides an effective video-DMA bandwidth of 7.2 MB/s which is the same specification as the original 16-bit Commodore Amiga chipset (OCS/ECS). The CPU can use up to half the available bandwidth, since it can only access a single 8-bit bank at a time. In higher demanding video modes, the CPU is slowed down due to increased cycle stealing from the video controller.

==== Enhanced VIC-II modes ====
In addition to having all of the C64 video modes, the CSG-4567 also supports several new character attributes such as "blink" or "bold" and can display any of the new or old video modes in 80 column or 640 horizontal pixel format, as well as the older 40 column 320 pixel format [6]. These enhanced "VIC-II" modes take up to 16 KB of system RAM. The sprite capabilities in all VIC modes are equivalent to the C64.

==== Bitplane modes ====
A new "bitplane" video mode was added to allow the displaying of true bitplane type video, with-up to eight bitplanes in 320 pixel mode and up to four in 640 pixel mode. The CSG-4567 can also time-multiplex the bitplanes to give a true four-color 1280 pixel picture. Vertical resolution is maintained at 200 lines as standard, but can be doubled to 400 with interlace [6]. The VIC-III bitplane modes take up to 64 KB of system RAM in non-interlaced or 128 KB RAM in interlaced (400 line) modes. Since the C65 is equipped with only 128 KB in its basic configuration, these modes would consume the entire RAM, and are therefore only useful in a RAM expanded system. On a basic system, it would probably have made more sense to write software which uses less demanding resolutions with fewer bitplanes—partly because this would consume less of the confined RAM space, but also because more bitplanes would demand a higher video DMA bandwidth and consequently slow down the CPU as a result.

==== DAT and Blitter ====
The bitplanes on the C65 are organized in a less straightforward manner than the Amiga, which organizes the bitplanes as straight rows of pixels: On the C65, the bytes within the bitplanes are organized as 25 rows of 40 or 80 stacks of 8 sequential bytes, similar to the original 320×200 VIC modes. Because this makes it harder to derive individual byte and pixel addresses from their position in the XY coordinate frame, the C65 provides a conversion mechanism in hardware called Display Address Translator (DAT).

Further aid to the programmer comes in the form of a bit-blitter, which supports

- Copy (up,down,invert), Fill, Swap, Mix (boolean Minterms) Hold, Modulus (window), Interrupt, and Resume modes
- Block operations from 1 byte to 64 KB

=== DOS ===
In contrast to previous 8-bit computers from Commodore, the C65 has a complete DOS through which the built-in 3.5-inch floppy disk drive can be controlled. Disks used by the C65 have a storage capacity of 880 KB and the drive is compatible with C1581. Since this format was uncommon for the former C64 owners, the C65 retains the serial IEC port for external Commodore disk drives. It's possible to use a 1541, 1571, 1581, or other similar model.

The DOS itself is based on the Commodore PET IEEE 8250 drive DOS. Since it can only deal with two floppy disk drives, including the internal, only one external drive may be connected to the internal floppy disk controller. Like earlier systems, up to four drives can be daisy-chained on the IEC port.

=== Interfaces ===
The C65 includes most of the same ports as the C64. In addition, there is a DMA port for memory expansion. The latter is attached just like on the Amiga 500 via a flap in the bottom of the board. The built-in floppy disk drive is connected in parallel, serial Commodore drives can be connected via the usual IEC port. A plug for a genlock was also provided. Only the port for the C64 datasette is no longer available, and the user port missing the 9 volt AC line. The expansion port differs significantly from all prior C64 variants and rather resembles that of C16.

== Legacy ==
Because the Commodore 65 was only a prototype, not many units were made. If one appears on eBay, it may sell for around $20,000.

=== MEGA65 ===
In 2015, the Museum of Electronic Games & Art (MEGA) announced a recreation of the Commodore 65. Also backwards compatible with the Commodore 64, the MEGA65 features Commodore 65 compatible hardware recreated in FPGA and supports newer connectors such as HDMI, MicroSD cards and LAN.

In September 2020, the pre-release developer-kit (r3) has sold out and in total 100 systems were delivered by the end of 2020.

On 30 September 2021, the final version of the MEGA65 with recreated C65 case, was available for pre-order. The first batch of 400 computers has sold out and been released to customers as of May 2022.

As of 10 May 2023, the second batch of 400 computers has also sold out and been released to customers.

The third batch followed a few months later and incorporates a few technical updates on the mainboard [reference to be added]. As of October 2024, the MEGA65 is no longer delivered per batch, and is readily available.
