= 4510 =

4510 may refer to:

- The year in the 46th century
- MOS Technology 4510, an 8-bit microprocessor chip
- RFC 4510, a published standard for the Lightweight Directory Access Protocol for computer communication
- 4510 Shawna, an asteroid
