= MOS Technology 6508 =

8-bit microprocessor

The MOS Technology 6508 is an 8-bit microprocessor designed by MOS Technology. Based on the popular 6502, the 6508 is augmented with two additional features: an internal 8-bit digital I/O port and 256 bytes of internal static RAM.

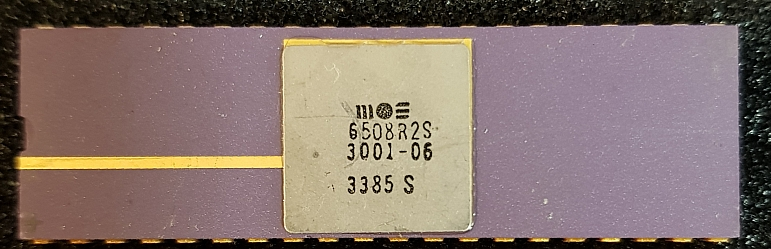
Ceramic variant of MOS6508 CPU

== Memory layout ==
The internal RAM is mapped into the CPU address space both at $0000-$00FF and at $0100-$01FF, so it can serve as both zero page and stack space. The I/O port is available at location $0001, with a data-direction register at $0000, which is the same layout of the 6510.

== Variants ==
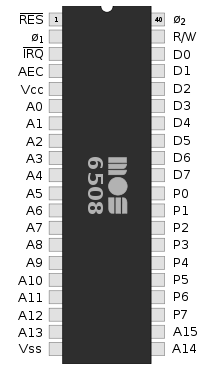
MOS Technology 6508 pin-out

There may be different strapping/bonding variants of this chip; the datasheet below lists pin 40 as clock phase two, but in the CBM900 computer, the 6508 controlling floppydisk has pin 40 as "Set Overflow" (SO). SO is a pin that is also offered on the 40-pin 6502, but omitted on all the 28-pin 650x variants (6503–6507). The SO pin, on 6500 family CPUs that have it, sets the Overflow flag in the P register, which can be tested using BVC/BVS instructions. Using SO, a tight polling loop of 3 machine cycles can be constructed, tighter than the minimum two instructions of any test and branch loop not using the SO pin functionality.
