= Plus/4 =

1984 home computer

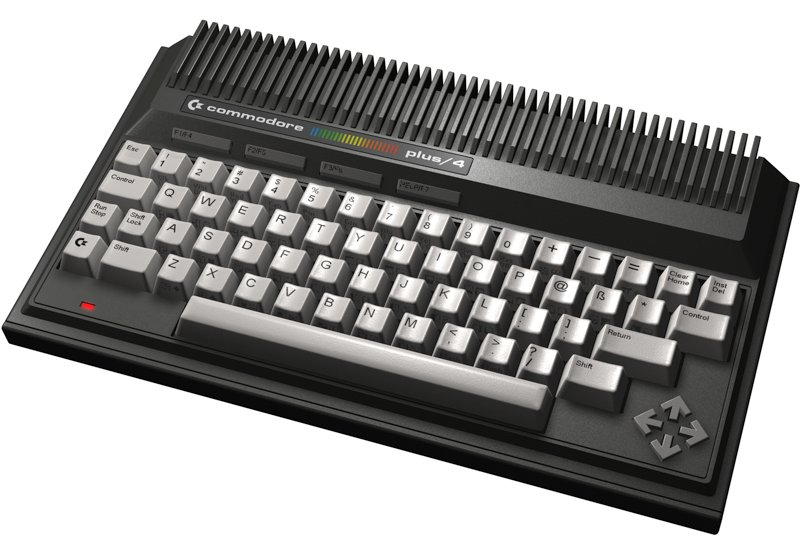
- The four arrow-shaped keys form the cursor key "diamond" to the right.
- Manufacturer: Commodore Business Machines
- Type: Home computer
- Released: 1984; 42 years ago
- Introductory price: US$299 (equivalent to $930 in 2025)
- Discontinued: 1985
- Operating system: Commodore BASIC 3.5
- CPU: MOS Technology 7501 or 8501 @ 1.76 MHz
- Memory: 64 KB RAM + 64 KB ROM
- Graphics: TED (320 × 200, 121 colors)
- Sound: TED (2-channel with 4-octave + white noise)

The Plus/4 is a home computer released by Commodore International in 1984. It is part of the Commodore 264 series, which also includes the Commodore 16 and Commodore 116 models. The Plus/4 was marketed as "the productivity computer with software built in", with a four-application ROM-resident office suite: word processor, spreadsheet, database, and graphing software.

Internally, the Plus/4 shares the same basic architecture as the Commodore 16 and 116, allowing it to use software and peripherals designed for these models. It is incompatible with the Commodore 64's extensive software library and some of its hardware. The Plus/4 was intended to expand the home computer market by targeting users interested in serious applications rather than gaming.

The Plus/4 has a compact plastic casing with a full keyboard, although the cursor and function keys are made of rubber. Its BASIC version 3.5 is software incompatible with the Commodore 64. Despite its potential, the Plus/4 was criticized for its lack of compatibility with the C64 and its deficiencies in sound and graphics compared to its predecessor.

Commodore produced approximately 827,000 units worldwide, with a significant number sold in Germany. The Plus/4 was discontinued in 1985, but systems remained available from liquidators for several years afterward.

== History ==
Startup screen

In the early 1980s, Commodore found itself engaged in a price war in the home computer market. Companies like Texas Instruments and Timex Corporation were releasing computers that undercut the price of Commodore's PET line. Commodore's MOS Technology division had designed a video chip but could not find any third-party buyers. The VIC-20 resulted from the confluence of these events and it was introduced in 1980 at a list price of $299.95. Later, spurred by the competition, Commodore was able to reduce the VIC's street price to $99, and it became the first computer (of any kind) to sell over 1 million units. The Commodore 64, the first 64 KB computer to sell for under US$600 in the US, was another salvo in the price war but it was far more expensive to make than the VIC-20 because it used discrete chips for video, sound, and I/O. Still, the C64 went on to become a best-seller and was selling for $199 at the time of the Plus/4's introduction. Even while C64 sales were rising, Commodore president Jack Tramiel wanted a new computer line that would use fewer chips and at the same time address some of the user complaints about the VIC and C64.

Rumors spread in late 1983 of a new computer in 1984 called the "Commodore 444" or "Ted", with built-in word processing and spreadsheet software, and that it would be one of four new computers that would replace the VIC-20 and C64, which the company would discontinue. The company's third salvo – which, as it turned out, was fired just as most of Commodore's competition was leaving the home computer market – was the C116, C16, and 264, which became the Plus/4. The original concept allowed customers to select the application software they wanted, with dealers installing the corresponding ROM chip. Commodore abandoned this approach by the summer of 1984. There were also prototypes of a 232, basically a 32 KB version of the Plus/4 without the software ROMs, and a V364, which had a numeric keypad and built-in voice synthesis. The latter two models never made it to production. All these computers used a 6502 compatible MOS 7501 or 8501 that was clocked approximately 75% faster than the CPUs used in the VIC-20 and C64, and a MOS Technology TED all-in-one video, sound, and I/O chip. The Plus/4's design is thus philosophically closer to that of the VIC-20 than that of the C64.

The Plus/4 was introduced in June 1984 and priced at US$299 (equivalent to $930 in 2025). The Plus/4 was the flagship computer of the line, featuring 64 KB of RAM while the C16 and C116 had 16 KB. The Plus/4 had built-in software, whereas the others did not. All of the machines were distinguished by their dark gray cases and light gray keys. This was a reversal of the color scheme on the C64 and VIC, which used lighter cases and darker-colored keys.

Commodore's intent with the Plus/4 was not to replace the C64, but to expand the home computer market and sell the Plus/4 to users who were more interested in serious applications than in gaming. By 1984, however, in the US, most of these customers were beginning to switch to the new, low-cost IBM PC compatibles such as the Leading Edge Model D and Tandy 1000 series.

It was discontinued in 1985. Although, like the Commodore B128, Plus/4 systems remained available from liquidators for years after its discontinuation, the Plus/4 disappeared from Commodore's major markets by 1988.

== Hardware ==
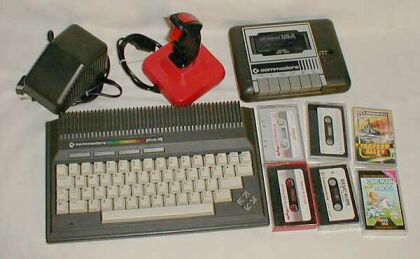
Plus/4 with accessories. Clockwise from top left: power supply, joystick, 1531 tape recorder with tapes

=== Graphics ===
The TED offered 121-color (15 colors × 8 luminance levels + black) video, a palette matched only by the Atari 8-bit computers and the Enterprise at the time, and 320×200 video resolution, similar to many computers intended to be capable of connecting to a television.

The TED chip had identical resolutions and video modes to the C64's VIC-II (bitmap or character graphics which could be high-resolution or multicolor), but lacked hardware sprites. Its sound capability was a two-voice square wave generator.

The first eight colors of the TED's palette are the same as the VIC-II, but colors 8-15 are different. It allowed each color except 0 (black) to be set to one of eight possible luminance levels, thus making 121 total colors possible.

The power-on default configuration places the screen memory at $0C00 and the color memory at $0800. Color memory is integrated into the TED and there is no separate color RAM like on the VIC-20 and C64. Bits 0-3 of each byte in color RAM hold the color value and 4-6 hold the luminance. Bit 7 is a flag that sets blinking text. Bitmap mode is similar to the C64, however in hi-res mode the color RAM is used to supply the luminance values for each block (bits 0-3 the luminance for color 0 and 4-7 the luminance for color 1) while it is not used at all in C64 hi-res graphics. In multicolor bitmap mode, the same setup is used, but while on the C64, color RAM holds the values for color 3, on the Plus/4 it instead holds the luminance values for colors 1–2. Color 3 is instead global and obtained from the register at $FF16.

The Plus/4's TED has several advantages over C64's VIC+SID. All TED registers that are available can be read and written. TED may realize the blinking cursor and the characters in the reverse-video mode. It may display 256 characters in the text mode. It may use graphics split by raster interrupt and show pictures at 320x288 resolution. This, with interlaced mode, makes it possible to show 320x496 images. In addition, the TED has 16 address lines, thus it can "see" the entire memory space of the computer unlike the VIC-II. The video buffers may thus be placed anywhere in memory and there are no mirrors of the character ROM to get in the way like on the C64.

=== Input and output ===
Commodore released a high-speed floppy disk drive for the Plus/4, the Commodore 1551, which offered much better performance than the C64/1541 combination because it used a parallel interface rather than a serial bus. The 1551 plugged into the cartridge port.

The Plus/4 had a built-in MOS Technology 6551 UART chip that could perform up to 19200 bit/s, unlike the C64, which emulated the 6551 chip in software. This allowed the Plus/4 to use high-speed modems without additional hardware or software tricks (the C64 required specially written software to operate at 2400 bit/s), at a time when 300- or 1200-bit/s modems were more common – and Commodore never released a 2400-bit/s modem – so this feature went largely unnoticed. The Plus/4's serial port is the standard Commodore user port used since the PET, featuring TTL voltage which is incompatible with RS-232. This requires a voltage converter to use modems or other serial devices from non-Commodore vendors.

The Plus/4 keyboard had a separately placed directional "diamond" of four cursor keys, presumably more intuitive to use than the VIC's and C64's two shifted cursor keys.

A reset button was added on the right side of the system, a feature lacking on the C64.

The Plus/4 also revived the built-in machine language monitor from the PET days, a feature missing on the VIC-20 and C64.

=== Specifications ===
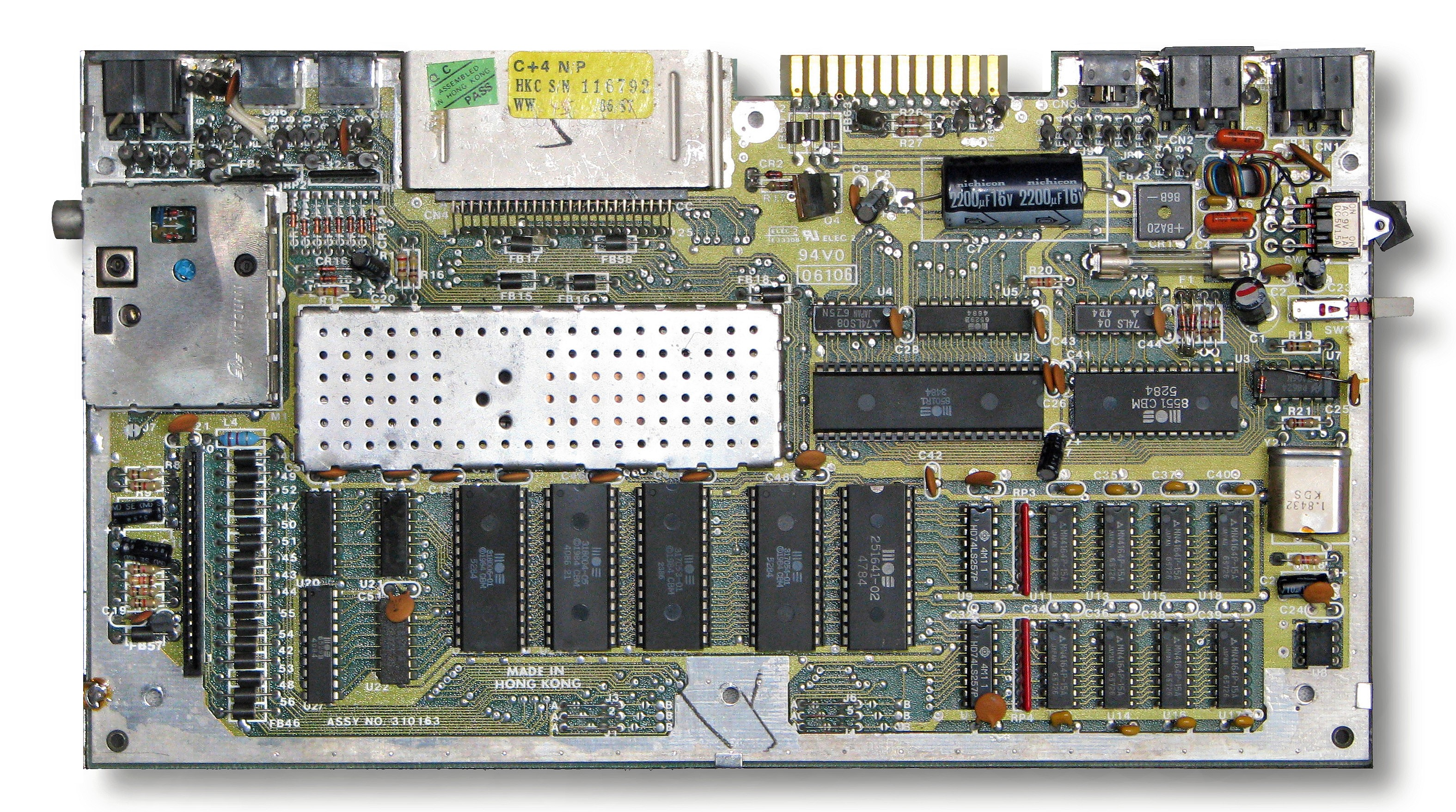
Main board

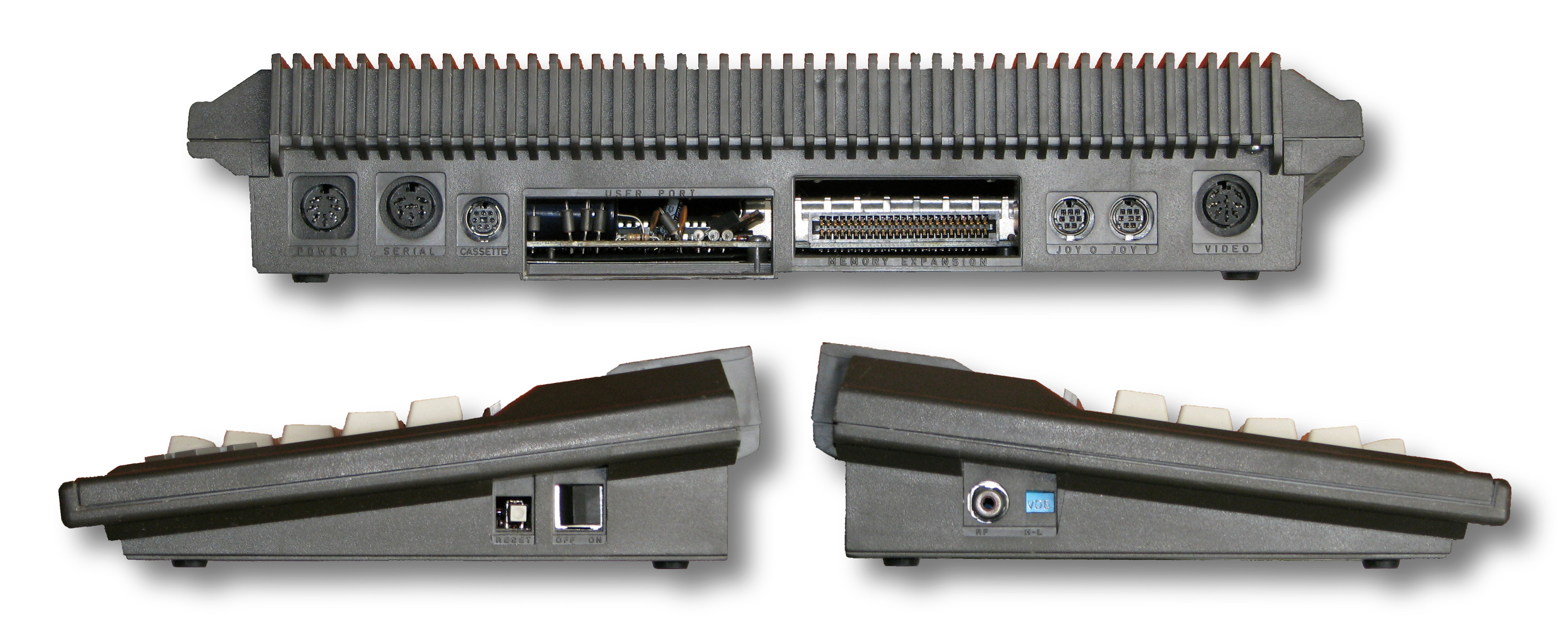
I/O ports

- CPU: MOS Technology 7501/8501, approximately 0.88 MHz when the raster beam is on the visible screen and 1.77 MHz (PAL) / 1.79 MHz (NTSC) the rest of the time
- RAM: 64 KB, of which nearly 60 KB (60671 bytes) is available to BASIC users. There are known RAM expansions with 256 KB and 1 MB
- ROM: 64 KB including Commodore BASIC 3.5, a machine code monitor, and TRI-Micro's "3 Plus 1" (word processor, spreadsheet, database, graphing). It is possible to add up to 64 KB more ROM with cartridges.
- Graphics: MOS Technology TED (TED 7360)
- Text mode: 40×25 characters (PETSCII). There are three text modes: standard, extended color, multicolor
- Graphics modes: 160x200 (multicolor, 2bpp, no sprites) / 320×200 (hi-resolution, 1bpp) at 121 colors (all can be visible at the same time)
- I/O ports:
  - Tape connector (for Commodore 1531 Datassette with 7-pin mini-DIN; incompatible with C64, although adapters allowing the machine to use earlier and aftermarket datasettes were common.)
  - ROM cartridge slot (incompatible with C64)
  - Two 8-pin mini-DIN game controller ports (incompatible with C64)
  - Commodore serial bus (compatible with C64)
  - User port (for modems and nonstandard devices, incompatible with C64)
  - Composite video connector including S-Video and mono audio signal (compatible with C64)
  - RF modulator to TV antenna connector (compatible with C64)
- The power connector is compatible with C64 power supplies in some Plus/4s and takes the same 9V AC and 5V DC voltages, but uses a non-standard "Square DIN" plug, like the C128, in most Plus/4s.

== Software ==
=== BASIC ===
The Plus/4's memory map, which used bank switching far more extensively than the C64, gave it a 56% larger amount of user-accessible memory than the C64 for programming in BASIC, and its BASIC programming language was vastly improved, adding sound and graphics commands as well as looping commands that improved program structure.

The Plus/4 does not have the Restore key on the VIC and C64, but a similar function may be achieved by holding down Run/Stop and pressing the reset button. This will reboot the computer into the machine language monitor, but any BASIC programs in memory will be left intact.

The Plus/4 contains an Easter egg. Entering the command SYS DEC("CDAB") or SYS 52651 puts up the names of three programmers and a hardware designer: Fred Bowen, John Cooper, Terry Ryan and Bil Herd, with Bowen's name at the top in reverse-field and Ryan's at the bottom blinking on and off.

While the C64 had the advertised 64 KB of RAM installed, only about 38 KB was available for BASIC programs. The Plus/4's BASIC V3.5 made 59 KB available, aided by its memory map that swapped the ROMs in and out of memory as needed, and that placed the memory mapped I/O registers, which all 6502-based computers have to use, at the top of memory ($FD00), while in the C64 they had been located at the much lower address $D000. On the C64, a program was able to swap out the ROMs and the I/O registers manually and thus gain access to the full 64 KB, but this was not compatible with BASIC on that machine; on the Plus/4, on the other hand, most of the ROM area was automatically switched out when not needed, rendering the RAM existing at the same addresses accessible for BASIC programs.

The BASIC program area on the Plus/4 begins at $1000, but the BASIC ROM starts at $8000 so the automatic switching of the OS ROMs is not initiated unless a BASIC program grows big enough to reach $8000, or 28K in size. Since RAM on the C16 never exceeds the $8000 line, banking does not occur on that machine. As on the C64, writing to the ROM areas will alter the RAM underneath.

The registers at $FDD0-$FDDF contain the ROM configuration for the machine, which normally has the BASIC and kernal ROMs enabled. The ROM configuration is adjusted by writing to the registers (the value is irrelevant). $FDD0 enables or disables BASIC, $FDD1 the low function ROM, $FDD2 the low cartridge ROM, $FDD3 is unused, $FDD4 the kernal, $FDD5 the high function ROM, and $FDD6 the high cartridge ROM. The upper portion of the kernal ROM at $FC00-$FCFF is always enabled no matter what the memory configuration, as are the I/O registers.

Furthermore, the registers at $FF3E-$FF3F if written to will bank out (or in) all ROMs currently enabled via the ROM configuration at $FDD0-$FDDF excepting $FC00-$FCFF; this is done by BASIC automatically to read program text above $8000. Since disabling the ROMs will also remove the kernal interrupt handler, it will be necessary to first turn off interrupts via an SEI instruction.

BASIC 3.5 added all of BASIC 4.0's disk commands as well as sound and graphics functions to support the TED, additional programming features, and statements to allow structured programming. While BASIC 2.0 was 8K in size and BASIC 4.0 12K, BASIC 3.5 ballooned to 20K in size, as big as the entire set of OS ROMs in the VIC-20 and C64.

=== Application software ===
The Plus/4, unlike the C64, was equipped with a ROM-resident application suite. It was, however, completely inadequate for the Plus/4's originally intended market of business and professional users. In an otherwise largely favorable review of the computer, John J. Anderson of Creative Computing wrote "I would guess that the applications were whipped up in a great hurry ... I would never use the software". The Transactor stated, "The word processor is barely that, the data base defiles the name, and the spreadsheet has little spread". The magazine advised users to "think of the software as an almost free bonus". BYTE called the built-in software "just a tiny bit better than bad", noting that a Commodore 64 with Multiplan and other third-party software would be cheaper and much more powerful. The magazine stated that the computer "should have been called not the Plus 4, but the Minus 60". INFO warned that users who wanted to use the computer "for serious 'productive' work, you are in deep trouble with the PLUS/4" because of the poor software, and unlikelihood that better third-party replacements would be available. Better business software packages were available for equivalently-priced systems, including the C64. Since IBM compatibles were quickly dominating the small business market, the Plus/4 had no realistic chance of succeeding in its intended use.

Further dividing the market was that once the user had created data using many of the built-in software packages, the result could only be saved to a connected disk drive – much of the software did not support tape. Thus, tape-based home users, the only users who might still have been interested in the Plus/4's less-capable but built-in and instantly ready software, were shut out from the package.

== Peripherals ==
The keyboard on the Plus/4 was different from the keyboards of previous Commodore machines and also its sibling the C16; this was due to cost saving measures resulting from the need to retool for Plus/4 production, while the C16 could use the existing C64 tooling due to an identical case design.

Peripheral compatibility with the C64 was inconsistent. The Plus/4's serial, user, and video ports were compatible with the C64, but the Datasette port was changed, rendering previous units incompatible without third-party adapters that only became available later. This also posed a problem for the many third-party C64 printer interfaces that allowed one to connect a standard Centronics parallel printer to the Commodore serial port. Since most of these interfaces connected to the Datasette port to get +5 volts for power, they were incompatible with the Plus/4 unless the user modified the interface and risked voiding the warranty. For a computer intended to be used for productivity applications, this was a heavy weakness. Additionally, with the Plus/4, Commodore abandoned the common Atari-style joystick ports used on the C64, replacing them with a proprietary mini-DIN port that was said to be less prone to emit RF interference.

The Plus/4 does not support analog devices via the joyports like the C64 mouse, making programs with a GUI such as GEOS less friendly to use.

== Performance ==
While the Plus/4's CPU could run about 75% faster than the C64's, the computer was still designed with a shared memory architecture, in which screen data resided in main memory. This means that the video chip has to access the memory while it is displaying the picture, in effect slowing down the CPU to less than half its full speed in this screen area. Only during those periods when the video chip is displaying the screen border or putting out the horizontal and vertical retrace signals is the CPU able to run at full speed. This means that, on average, with standard 40x25 screen the Plus/4's CPU runs only about 15% faster than that of the C64. However, as mentioned the Plus/4 can be 75% faster than a C64 when using screen blanking mode. The Plus/4's PAL model may also be switched to NTSC mode by disabling the screen which sets the CPU frequency to 2.22 MHz (this is 115% faster than C64's maximum speed). So a Plus/4 (PAL) is one of the fastest 6502 based computers for raw calculations. This is true for programs in machine code but BASIC 3.5 is slightly slower than BASIC 2.0 due to its greater size, and performance slows down further when programs cross over the $8000 line because the BASIC ROM has to be switched out to read BASIC program text. The NTSC model of Plus/4 is about 10% slower than the PAL model displaying a standard screen but slightly faster with screen blank.

== Reliability ==
The Plus/4 also suffered serious reliability problems due to the TED chip, which was one of the first ICs MOS developed using the newer, lower power HMOS process. MOS had considerable difficulty getting it to work reliably and TED chips and the 7501 CPU consequently had a high failure rate. Autofire-capable joysticks and improperly constructed 9-pin adapters have also been blamed for damaging TED chips. The C16 had fewer reliability problems than the Plus/4 due to a simpler design with fewer ICs and lower heat output, as well as more room inside the case for heat to disperse.

Like with the C64, the Plus/4 also used an unreliable power supply that was prone to overheating and damaging components in the machine.

This made upgrading to the Plus/4 from the VIC-20 or C64 more expensive, since the user in many cases would have to buy new peripherals in addition to the new computer. It also made the Plus/4 less attractive to new buyers, since VIC and C64 peripherals were more plentiful and less expensive than their Plus/4 counterparts. The street price for a complete C64 system was lower than that of a comparable system based on the Plus/4. Combined with the C64's greater abilities and broader software base, most buyers opted for the older model.

== Reception ==
The Plus/4 was sold at closeout sales through the computer press via ads similar to this one

The press mocked the Plus/4. INFO showed a photo of the new (competitor) computer with the caption "Is this a joke?" and compared it to the Ford Edsel and to a dinosaur. Compute!'s Gazette compared the Plus/4 to "The Emperor's New Clothes". Many predicted that it would quickly fail; INFO gave away its review unit in a sweepstakes for readers, promising that the computer was "Sure to become a collector's item!". Even a defender of the machine acknowledged that the Plus/4 was expensive compared to the C64, and that the built-in applications' quality was poor.

Computer dealers disliked Commodore's usual practice of introducing new computers incompatible with existing ones. Steve Leininger, the designer of the Tandy TRS-80 Model I, said in July 1984 that the new computer's incompatibility with C64 software "makes you wonder". He added "It's a little on the spooky side", unfavorably comparing the Plus/4 to the Apple IIc's compatibility with the tens of thousands of Apple II software packages.

Another problem that kept the Plus/4 from selling was that even though the three machines (116, C16 and Plus/4) were all compatible with one another, developers tended to write programs for the lowest common denominator in a computer family. So as not to alienate buyers of the C116 and C16, which were intended to be the largest selling machines in this series, most software was designed to run in 16 KB and the extra memory on the Plus/4 was not as widely supported as it could have been. Also, most development for these machines was in the less-lucrative European markets. Major software developers in North America continued to focus instead on the huge C64 market. Plus/4 software development in North America was mostly the domain of obscure companies who sold products via mail order, similar to other computers like the TRS-80 CoCo that did not have support from major developers.

== Adoption ==
In total, 1 million 264-series machines were sold in slightly more than a year on the market. Of these, 400,000 were Plus/4s with most of the remainder being C16s. Approximately 50,000 were C116s, with about 43,000 of those being sold in Germany, and the Plus/4 accounted for about 60%-70% of North American sales. Commodore's ultimate decision to discontinue the 264 line was not due to lack of sales, but in order to free up production capacity for C64s for the 1985 Christmas season.

The Plus/4 was later used in Denmark, as part of a bundled product from the then-national telecommunications company (now TDC A/S) to help hearing-impaired people communicate over telephone lines. Outgoing calls were made from the Plus/4 via modem to a call center where a service assistant would read the written input from the user, call the other party and read the text aloud. Vice versa, incoming calls could be made from other users to the call center, who would dial the Plus/4 modem. A strobe light connected to the Plus/4 would notify the hearing impaired person about the incoming call.

The Plus/4 enjoyed lasting popularity in Hungary due to CBM's decision to saturate the Central European market with the failed product at a greatly reduced price. A number of unofficial ports of C64 games were produced by Hungarian users.

== Succession ==
Most of the developers of the Plus/4 also worked on the later Commodore 128 project, which was much more successful. Even as the Plus/4 and C16 began shipping, Compute!'s Gazette cited rumors that they were being "'de-emphasized'" in favor of the forthcoming 128 which, the magazine reported, would be both hardware and software compatible with the C64. Their shortcomings were the inspiration for the Commodore 128 series as, urged on by the computer press, the designers calculated that if they created a computer that was compatible with the C64 that ultimately management and marketing could not damage the C64 software base (much) in spite of how they were to take the product to market.

== See also ==
- Category:Commodore 16 and Plus/4 games
