= Commodore 1551 =

Floppy disk drive for the Commodore C-16 and Plus/4

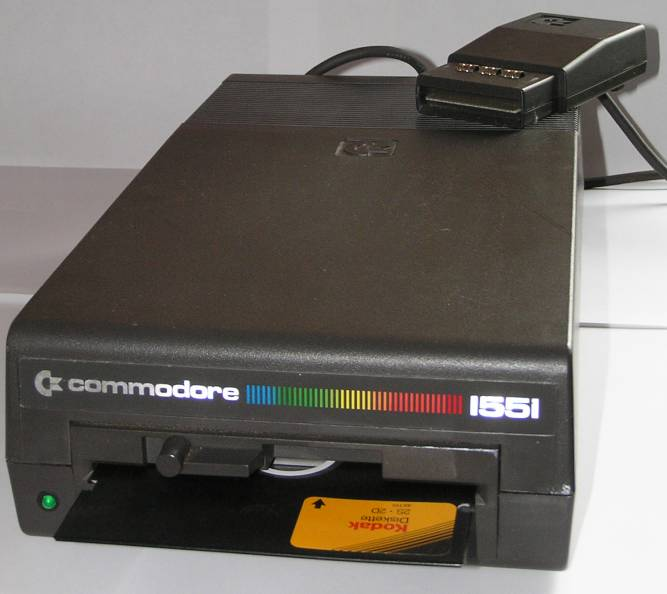
- European Commodore 1551 disk drive, showing the connector
- Codename: SFS481
- Manufacturer: Commodore Business Machines, Inc.
- Product family: Commodore 264 series
- Type: Floppy drive
- Released: 1984; 42 years ago
- Introductory price: US$400 (1984) equivalent to $1,200 in 2025
- Discontinued: 1986
- Media: 5.25" floppy disk Single Sided, Single Density
- Operating system: CBM DOS 2.6
- CPU: MOS 6510T
- Memory: 2 kB RAM; 16 kB ROM
- Storage: 170 kB
- Connectivity: TED parallel port
- Dimensions: 97 mm × 200 mm × 374 mm 3.8 in × 7.9 in × 14.7 in
- Weight: 10.5 kg 23 lb
- Backward compatibility: Commodore 16; Plus/4
- Predecessor: Commodore 1541
- Successor: Commodore 1570; Commodore 1571

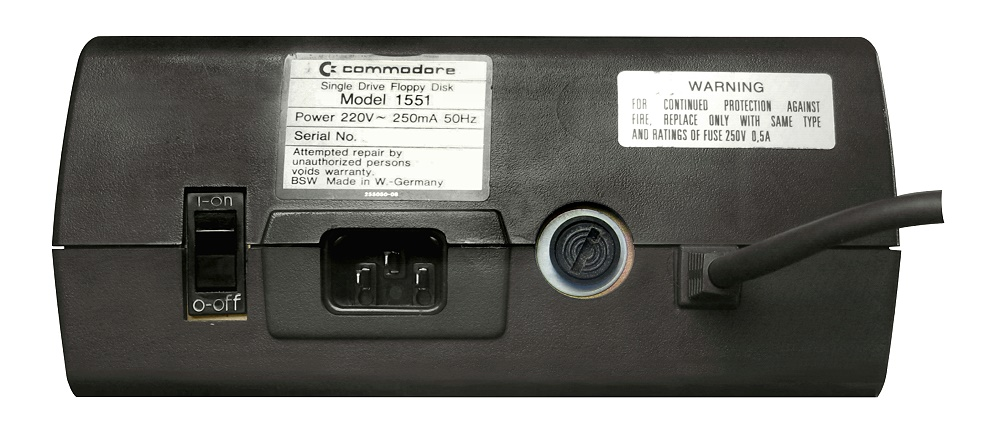
Rear view

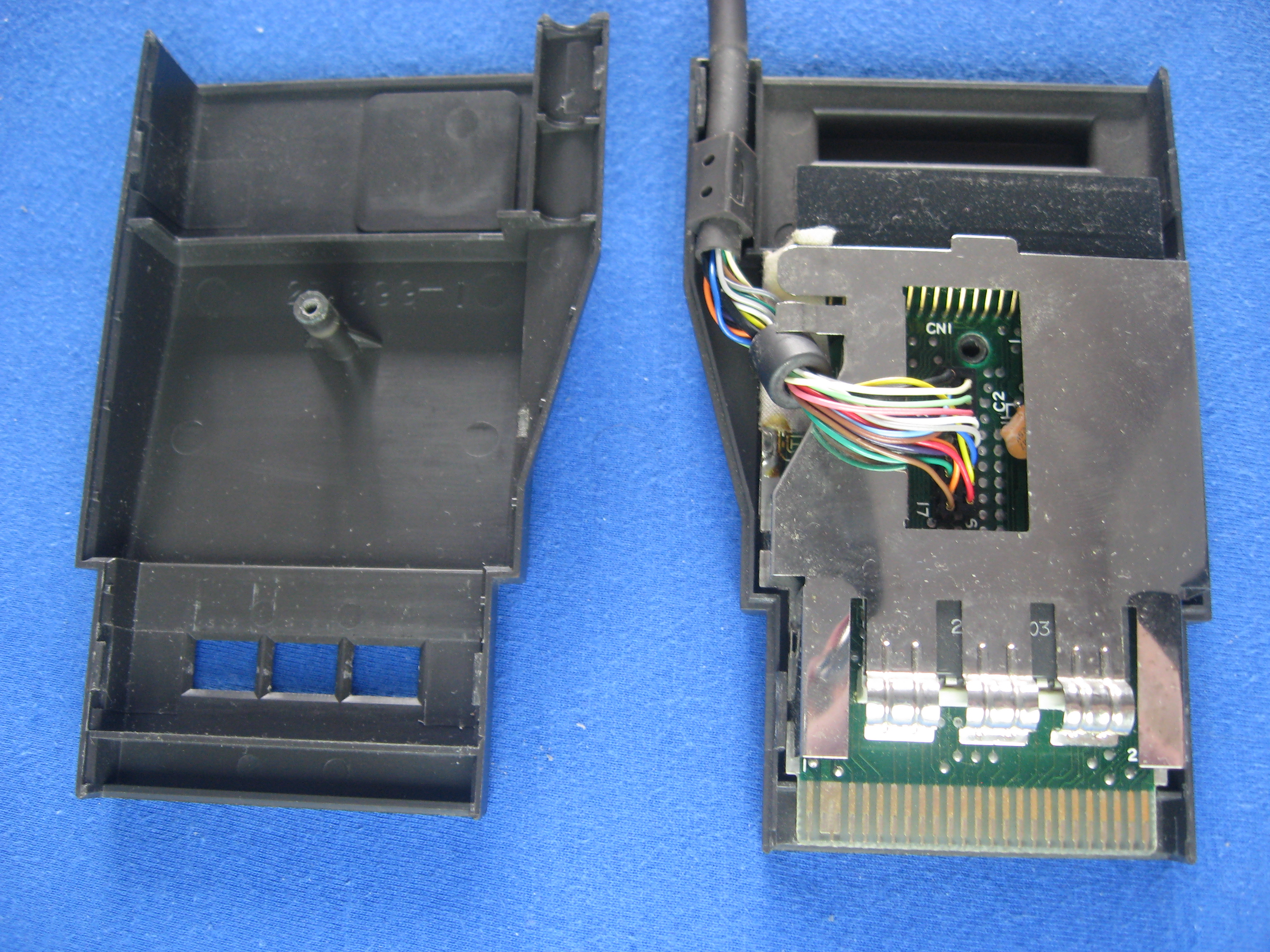
Adapter interior

The Commodore 1551 (originally introduced as the SFS 481) is a floppy disk drive for the Commodore 16 and Plus/4 home computers. It resembles a charcoal-colored Commodore 1541 and plugs into the cartridge port, providing faster access than the C64/1541 combination. Commodore reportedly planned an interface to allow use of the 1551 with the C64, but it was never released.

Aside from faster access, the drive is very similar to the 1541. Like the 1541, it is a single-sided 170-kilobyte drive for 5¼" disks, with each disk split into 664 256-byte blocks available for user data plus 19 blocks for DOS data and directory; the file system makes each block its own cluster.

== Hardware ==
The disk drive uses group coded recording and contains an MOS Technology 6510T processor as a disk controller. The 6510T is a specialized version of the 6510 processor used in the C64, and it is only used in the 1551. The DOS limits the number of files per disk to 144 regardless of the number of free blocks on the disk because the directory is of a fixed size, and the file system does not allow for subdirectories. Its DOS is compatible with the 1541, so disks written by one drive can be utilized in the other.

The 1551 has no DIP switches to change the drive's device number. If a user added more than one drive to a system, they had to open the case and cut a trace in the circuit board to permanently change the drive's number, or hand-wire an external switch to allow it to be changed externally. It is possible to connect a maximum of two 1551s to one computer.
