= MOS Technology =

Semiconductor company based in Pennsylvania, U.S.

Coordinates: 40°07′27.9″N 75°25′07.2″W

MOS Technology, Inc.
- Industry: Semiconductor design and manufacturing
- Predecessor: Allen-Bradley
- Founded: 1969
- Defunct: 2001
- Successor: Commodore Semiconductor Group; Western Design Center
- Headquarters: Audubon, Pennsylvania, United States

MOS Technology, Inc. ("MOS" being short for Metal Oxide Semiconductor), later known as CSG (Commodore Semiconductor Group) and GMT Microelectronics, was a semiconductor design and fabrication company based in Audubon, Pennsylvania. It is most famous for its 6502 microprocessor and various designs for Commodore International's range of home computers.

== History ==
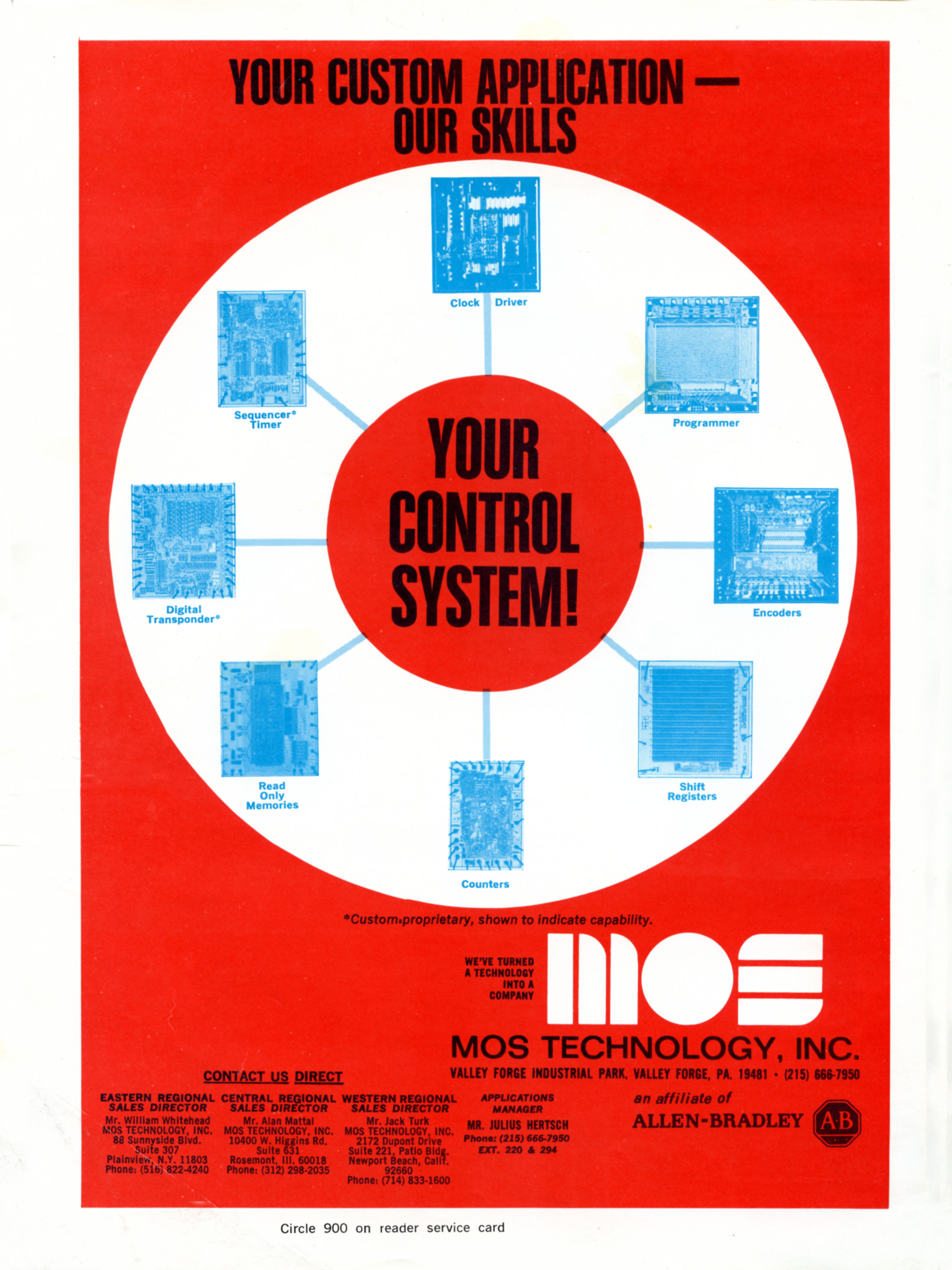
A 1973 MOS Technology advertisement highlighting their custom integrated circuit capabilities

Three former General Instrument executives, John Paivinen, Mort Jaffe and Don McLaughlin, formed MOS Technology in Valley Forge, Pennsylvania in 1969. The Allen-Bradley Company was looking to provide a second source for electronic calculators and their chips designed by Texas Instruments (TI). In 1970 Allen-Bradley acquired a majority interest in MOS Technology.

In the early 1970s, TI decided to release their own line of calculators, instead of selling just the chips inside them, and introduced them at a price that was lower than the price of the chipset alone. Many early chip companies were reliant on sales of calculator chips and were wiped out in the aftermath; those that survived did so by finding other chips to produce. MOS became a supplier to Atari, producing a custom single-chip Pong system.

Things changed dramatically in 1975. Several of the designers of the Motorola 6800 left Motorola shortly after its release, after management told them to stop working on a low-cost version of the design. At the time there was no such thing as a pure-play semiconductor foundry, so they had to join a chip-building company to produce their new CPU. MOS was a small firm with good credentials in the right area, the east coast of the US. The team of four design engineers was headed by Chuck Peddle and included Bill Mensch. At MOS they set about building a new CPU that would outperform the 6800 while being similar to it in purpose and much less expensive. The resulting 6501 design was somewhat similar to the 6800, but by using several design simplifications, the 6501 would be up to four times faster.

=== Mask fixing ===
Previous CPU designs, like the 6800, were produced using a device known as a contact aligner. This was essentially a complex photocopier, which optically reproduced a CPU design, or "mask", on the surface of the silicon chip. The name "contact" referred to the fact that the mask was placed directly on the surface of the chip, which had the significant disadvantage that it sometimes pulled away materials from the chip, which were then copied to subsequent chips. This caused the mask to become useless after about a dozen copies, and resulted in the vast majority of chips having fatal flaws; for a complex chip like the 6800, only about 10% of the chips would work once the masking process was complete.

In 1974 Perkin-Elmer publicly introduced the Micralign system, the first projection scanner. Instead of placing the mask on the surface of the chip, it held it far from the surface and used highly accurate optics to project the image. Masks now lasted for thousands of copies instead of tens, and the flaw rate of the chips inverted so that perhaps 70% of the chips produced would work. The result was a similar inversion in pricing. The 6800 sold in small lots for $295; with no other changes than using a Micralign, the same design could sell for $42.

The change to the Micralign revealed a further advantage. Previously the masks were mass-produced by photography companies like Kodak, who would make tens of thousands of copies of a master mask, or "reticle", and ship the masks to the aligners by the truckload. This meant that if a flaw was found in the design, it would cost a significant amount of money to fix it, as all the older masks would have to be thrown out. In contrast, with Micralign there was only one mask per aligner, so there was no inherent cost in replacing the mask if need be, although the cost, and especially time, of producing these master masks was considerable.

MOS developed the ability to "fix" its masks after they had been produced. This meant that as flaws in the design were discovered, the masks could be removed from the aligners, fixed, and put back in. This allowed them to rapidly drive out flaws in the original masks.

The company's production lines typically reversed the numbers others were achieving; even the early runs of a new CPU design—what would become the 6502—were achieving a success rate of 70 percent or better. This meant that not only were its designs faster, but they also cost much less as well.

=== 6502 family ===
Following announcement of the 6501 in the summer of 1975, Motorola filed a lawsuit in November. Although the 6501 instruction set was not compatible with the 6800, it could nevertheless be plugged into existing motherboard designs because it had the same functional pin arrangement and IC package footprint. In March 1976, MOS reached a settlement with Motorola and agreed to stop selling the 6501 and pay Motorola US$200,000.

In the meantime MOS had started selling the 6502, a chip capable of operating at 1 MHz in September 1975 for a mere US$25. It was nearly identical to the 6501, with only a few minor differences: an added on-chip clock oscillator, a different functional pinout arrangement, generation of the SYNC signal (supporting single-instruction stepping), and removal of data bus enablement control signals (DBE and BA, with the former directly connected to the phase 2 clock instead). It outperformed the more-complex 6800 and Intel 8080, but cost much less and was easier to work with. Although it did not have the 6501's advantage of being able to be used in place of the Motorola 6800 in existing hardware, it was so inexpensive that it quickly became more popular than the 6800, making that a moot point.

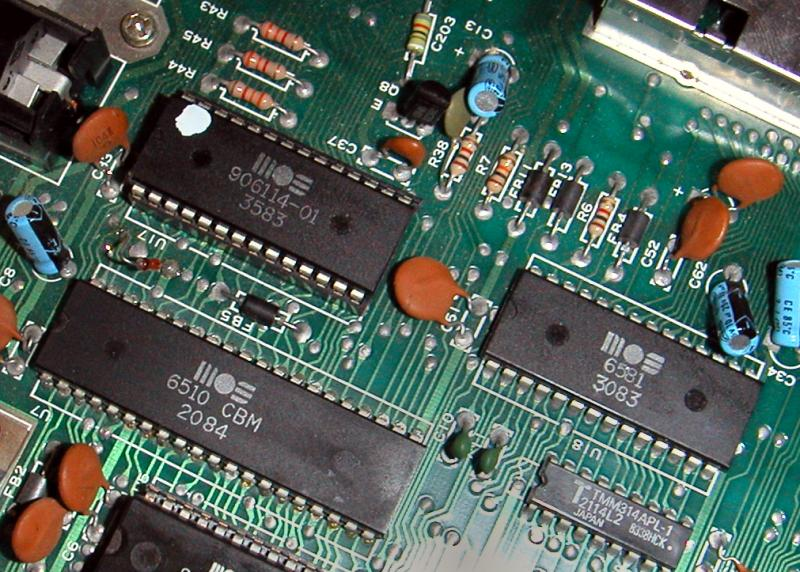
Image of the circuit board of a Commodore 64 showing some important MOS Technology circuits: the 6510 CPU (long chip, lower left) and the 6581 SID (right). The production week/year (WWYY) of each chip is given below its name.

The 6502 was so cheap that many people believed it was a scam when MOS first showed it at a 1975 trade show. They were not aware of MOS's masking techniques and when they calculated the price per chip at the current industry yield rates, it did not add up. But any hesitation to buy it evaporated when both Motorola and Intel dropped the prices on their own designs from $179 to $69 at the same show in order to compete. Their moves legitimized the 6502, and by the show's end, the wooden barrel full of samples was empty.

The 6502 would quickly go on to be one of the most popular chips of its day. A number of companies licensed the 650x line from MOS, including Rockwell International, GTE, Synertek, and Western Design Center (WDC).

A number of different versions of the basic CPU, known as the 6503 through 6507, were offered in 28-pin packages for lower cost. The various models removed signal or address pins. Far and away the most popular of these was the 6507, which was used in the Atari 2600 and Atari disk drives. The 6504 was sometimes used in printers. MOS also released a series of similar CPUs using external clocks, which added a "1" to the name in the third digit, as the 6512 through 6515. These were useful in systems where the clock support was already being provided on the motherboard by some other source. The final addition was the "crossover" 6510, used in the Commodore 64, with additional I/O ports.

=== Commodore Semiconductor Group ===
However successful the 6502 was, the company itself was having problems. At about the same time the 6502 was being released, MOS's entire calculator IC market collapsed, and its prior existing products stopped shipping. Soon they were in serious financial trouble. Another company, Commodore Business Machines (CBM), had invested heavily in the calculator market and was also nearly wiped out by TI's entry into the market. A fresh injection of capital saved CBM, and allowed it to invest in company suppliers in order to help ensure their IC supply would not be upset in this fashion again. Among the several companies were LED display manufacturers, power controllers, and suppliers of the driver chips, including MOS.

In September 25, 1976, CBM, publicly traded on the NYSE with a market capitalization around US$60 million, purchased MOS (whose market cap was around US$12 million) in an all-stock deal. Holders of MOS received a 9.4 percent equity stake in CBM on the condition that Chuck Peddle would join Commodore as chief engineer. The deal went through, and while the firm basically became Commodore's production arm, they continued using the name MOS for some time so that manuals would not have to be reprinted. After a while MOS became the Commodore Semiconductor Group (CSG). Despite being renamed to CSG, all chips produced were still stamped with the old "MOS" logo until week 22/23 of 1989.

MOS had previously designed a simple computer kit called the KIM-1, primarily to "show off" the 6502 chip. At Commodore, Chuck Peddle convinced the owner, Jack Tramiel, that calculators were a dead end, and that home computers would soon be huge.

However, the original design group appeared to be even less interested in working for Jack Tramiel than it had for Motorola, and the team quickly started breaking up. One result was that the newly completed 6522 (VIA) chip was left undocumented for years.

Bill Mensch left MOS even before the Commodore takeover, and moved home to Arizona. After a short stint consulting for a local company called ICE, he set up the Western Design Center (WDC) in 1978. As a licensee of the 6502 line, their first products were bug-fixed, power-efficient CMOS versions of the 6502 (the 65C02, both as a separate chip and embedded inside a microcontroller called the 65C150). But then they expanded the line greatly with the introduction of the 65816, a fairly straightforward 16-bit upgrade of the original 65C02 that could also run in 8-bit mode for compatibility. Since then WDC moved much of the original MOS catalog to CMOS, and the 6502 continued to be a popular CPU for the embedded systems market, like medical equipment and car dashboard controllers.

=== GMT Microelectronics ===
After Commodore's bankruptcy in 1994, Commodore Semiconductor Group, MOS's successor, was bought by its former management for about $4.3 million, plus an additional $1 million to cover miscellaneous expenses including a United States Environmental Protection Agency (EPA) license. Dennis Peasenell became CEO. In December 1994, the EPA entered into a Prospective Purchase Agreement (limiting the company's liability in exchange for sharing the costs of cleanup) with GMT Microelectronics. In 1994, the company, operating under the name GMT Microelectronics (Great Mixed-signal Technologies), reopened MOS Technology's original, circa-1970 one-micrometre process fab (semiconductor fabrication plant) in Audubon, Montgomery County, Pennsylvania that Commodore had closed in 1993.

The plant had been on the EPA's National Priorities List of hazardous waste sites since October 4, 1989. This was due to a 1978 leak of trichloroethylene (TCE) from an underground 250-gallon (946-liter) concrete storage tank used by Commodore Business Machines in the semiconductor cleaning process. Leaks from the tank had caused the local groundwater to become contaminated with TCE and other volatile organic compounds (VOCs) in 1978. By 1999, GMT Microelectronics had $21 million in revenues and 183 employees working on the site. Announced in March 1999, GMT would have provided foundry services based on TelCom's Bipolar and SiCr (silicon chromium) Thin Film Resistor processes and would have been a licensed alternate source for TelCom's Bipolar based products, with production running at 10,000 5-inch semiconductor wafers per month, producing CMOS, BiCMOS, NMOS, bipolar and SOI (silicon on insulator) devices. In 2000, GMT Microelectronics discontinued operations and abandoned all of its assets at the Commodore Semiconductor Group superfund site.

== Chip naming convention ==
Most of the MOS chips are named according to following rules, which shows used technology (logic gate design):

- NMOS (M65xx)
- CMOS (M65Cxx)
- HMOS (M75xx)
- HMOS-2 (M85xx)

== Products ==
- KIM-1 – single board computer (kit)/CPU evaluation board, based on 6502
- 2521 – 8-digit calculator chip
- 2523 – 8-digit calculator chip
- 2529 – Single chip scientific calculator array
- 4510 – CPU (CSG 65CE02) with two CIAs on-chip; 3.45 MHz
- 4567 – VIC-III Video Interface Chip
- 5719 – Gary Gate Array
- 6501 – CPU pin-compatible with Motorola 6800
- 6502 – CPU equal to 6501 except no 6800-pin-compatibility
- 65CE02 – CPU derived from the 6502
- 6503 – CPU with 12 address pins, NMI pin and IRQ pin
- 6504 – CPU with 13 address pins and IRQ pin
- 6505 – CPU with 12 address pins, IRQ pin and RDY pin.
- 6507 – CPU with 13 address pins
- 6508 – CPU with 256 B RAM and 8 I/O pins
- 6509 – CPU with 20 address pins
- 6510 – CPU with clock pins and I/O ports,
- 6520 – PIA Peripheral Interface Adapter
- 6522 – VIA Versatile Interface Adapter
- 6523/6525 – Tri-Port Interface
- 6526/8520/8521 – CIA Complex Interface Adapter
- 6529 – SPI/SPIA Single Port Interface Adapter
- 6530 – RRIOT ROM-RAM-I/O Timer
- 6532 – RIOT RAM-I/O Timer
- 6540 – 2 KiB ROM
- 6545 – CRTC CRT Controller
- 6550 – 512 byte Static RAM
- 6551 – ACIA Asynchronous Communications Interface Adapter
- 6560 – VIC Video Interface Chip, (NTSC)
- 6561 – VIC Video Interface Chip, (PAL) Revision: -101 / E
- 6562 – VIC Video Interface Chip, (NTSC) (6561 supporting 40-column)
- 6564 – 80-column video (intended for Colour PET, part of its design used in the MOS 6560/6561)
- 6566 – VIC-II (MaxMachine)
- 6567 – VIC-II (NTSC) Revision: R56A/R7/R8/R9
- 6569 – VIC-II (PAL) Revision: R1/R3/R4/R5 (R1 = only 5 lumas)
- 6570 – 6500/1 microcontroller on keyboard PCB in Amiga 500 revision: -036
- 6572 – VIC-II (PAL-N)
- 6573 – VIC-II (PAL-M)
- 6581/6582/8580 – SID Sound Interface Device
- 7360/8360 – TED Text Editing Device (HMOS-I/II)
- 7501 – CPU HMOS-I 6502 with 7-bit I/O port
- 8361 – AGNUS Address Generator Unit (NTSC)
- 8362 – DENISE Display Encoder
- 8364 – PAULA Port Audio UART and Logic
- 8367 – AGNUS Address Generator Unit (PAL)
- 8370 – "Fat" AGNUS Address Generator Unit (NTSC)
- 8371 – "Fat" AGNUS Address Generator Unit (PAL)
- 8372 – ECS AGNUS Address Generator Unit
- 8373 – ECS DENISE Display Encoder
- 8374 – AGA ALICE Address Generator Unit
- 8375 – ECS AGNUS Address Generator Unit
- 8500 – CPU HMOS-II Version of 6510
- 8501 – CPU HMOS-II 6502 with 7-bit I/O port
- 8502 – CPU compatible with 6510 but able to run at 2 MHz
- 8520 – CIA (Complex Interface Adapter) 1 MHz 8520 or 2 MHz 8520A-1 in Amiga
- 8551 – ACIA Asynchronous Communications Interface Adapter, HMOS-II variant of the 6551
- 8562 – VIC-II (NTSC)
- 8563 – VDC Video Display Controller
- 8564 – VIC-II (NTSC)
- 8565 – VIC-II (PAL)
- 8566 – VIC-II (PAL)
- 8568 – VDC with composite HSYNC, VSYNC, and RDY interrupt
- 8701 – clock generator
- 8721 – PLA
- 8722 – MMU Memory Management Unit
- 8726 – REC RAM Expansion Controller
- 8727 – DMA Direct Memory Access
