= Bil Herd =

US computer engineer

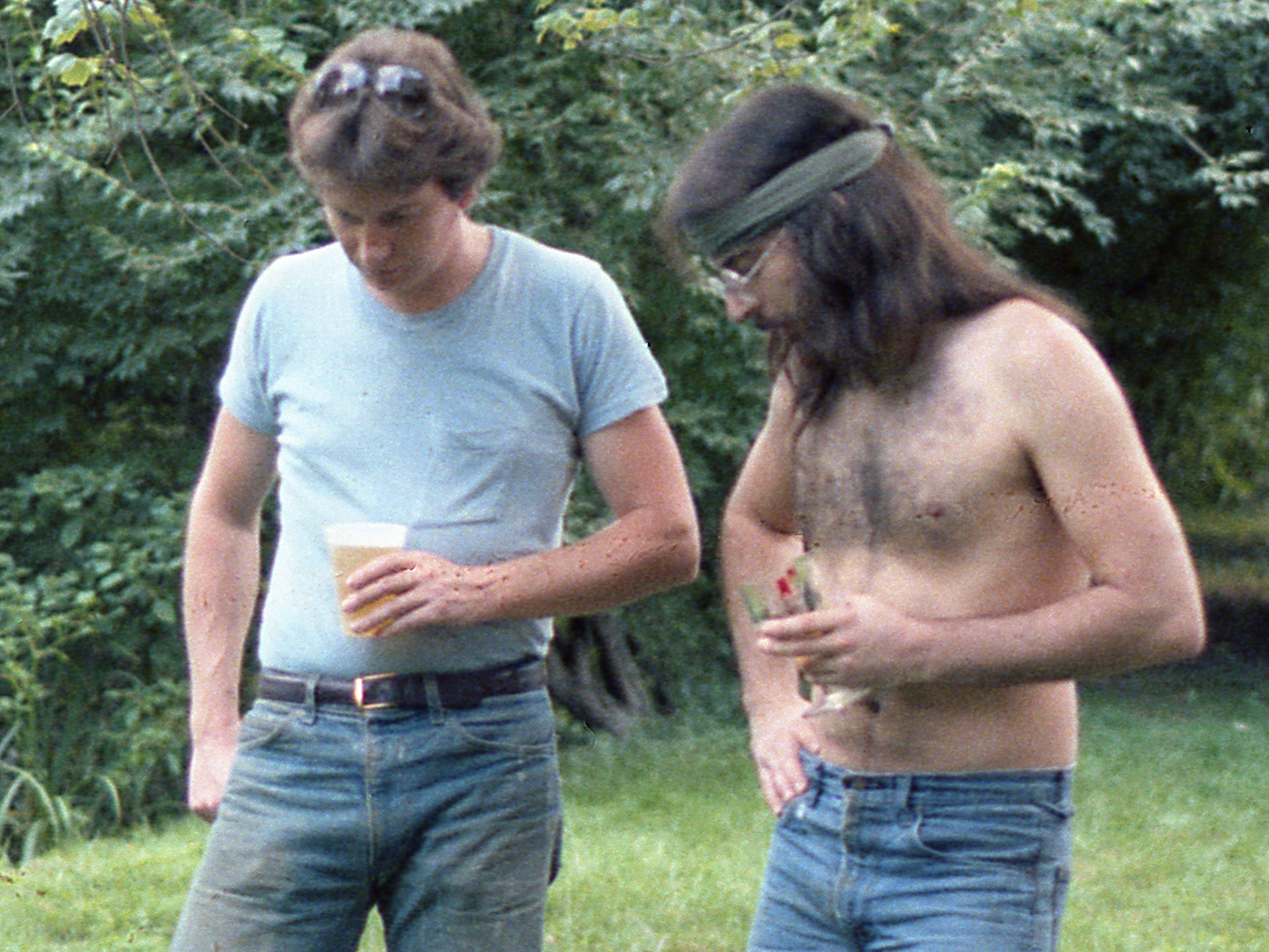
Best friends Bil Herd (right) and Dave DiOrio enjoying time together.

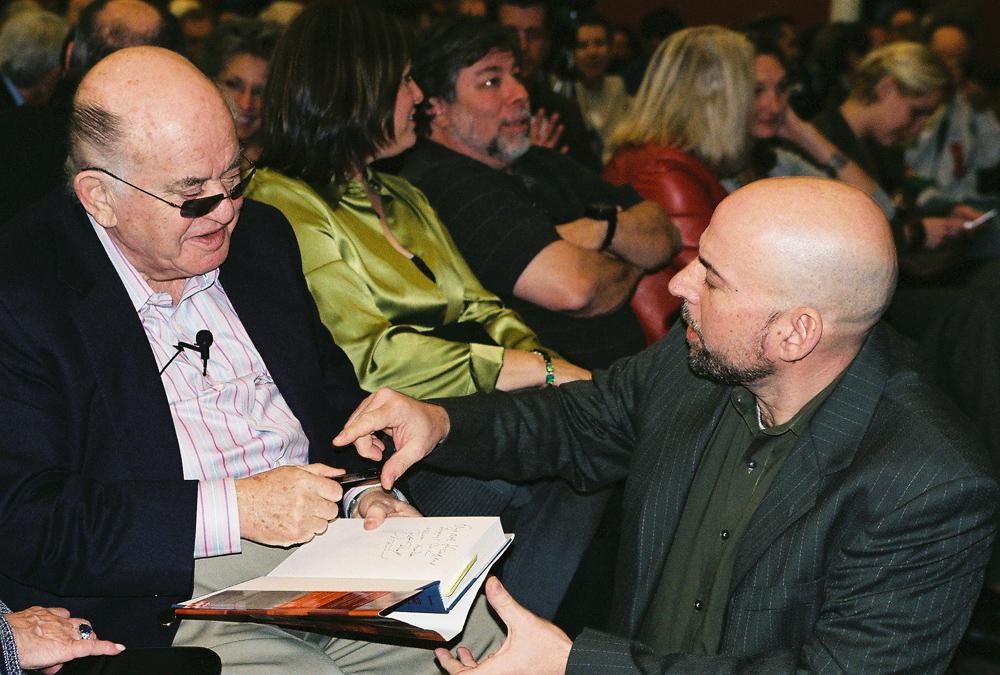
Bil Herd (right) speaks to Jack Tramiel at the 25th Anniversary of the Commodore 64 at the Computer History Museum in 2007.

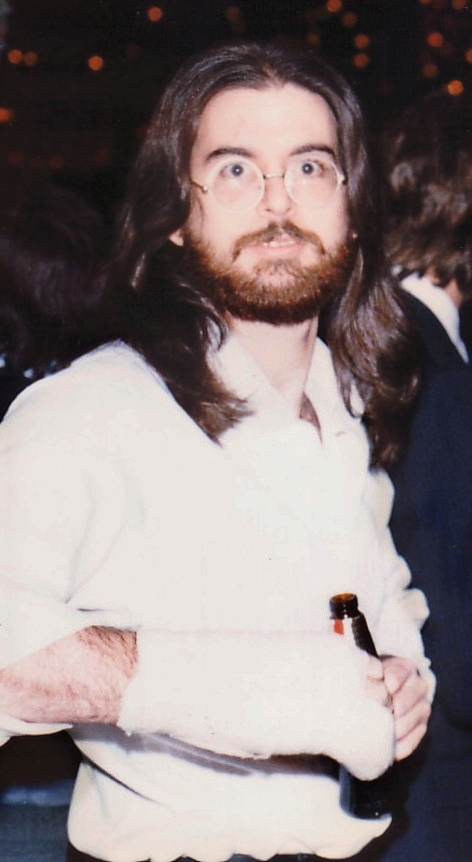
Bil Herd at Commodore Christmas Party 1985

Bil Herd is a computer engineer who created several designs for 8-bit home computers while working for Commodore Business Machines in the early to mid-1980s.

== Early life ==
He attended the Indiana school system. Though Herd did not have a college degree and did not graduate high school, he was working as an engineer by the age of 20.

== Military service ==
- 1977–1980: 238th Cavalry - 38th Division Indiana Army National Guard
- 1980–1982: 103rd Medical Battalion - 28th Division Pennsylvania Army National Guard
- 1981: Army Commendation Medal for meritorious service.

== Working for Commodore ==
After first acting as the principal engineer on the Plus/4, C16/116, C264, and C364 machines, Herd designed the significantly more successful Commodore 128, a dual-CPU, triple-OS, compatible successor to the Commodore 64. Prior to the C128, Herd had done the initial architecture of the Commodore LCD computer, which was not released.

== After Commodore ==
After leaving Commodore, Herd continued to design faster and more powerful computers with emphasis on machine vision and is a co-author on a patent involving n-dimensional pattern matching. He also designed an ultrasonic backup sensor for vehicles while working for Indian Valley Mfg. in 1986, a feature found on many modern vehicles today.

Voluntary health care work:

- 1989–1996: Fellowship First Aid Squad / Mount Laurel EMS Inc. Highest rank: Captain (also served as president)
- 1991–1995: Cooper Trauma Center - Camden, NJ: Trauma Technician

Herd has undertaken an entrepreneurial role and is owner of several small companies. As for recent low-level computer hacking, he did a "cameo appearance" by contributing a snippet of sprite logic code to the C64 DTV product designed by Jeri Ellsworth.

Herd appeared in and narrated the documentary "Growing the 8 Bit Generation" (a.k.a. "The Commodore Wars") about the early days of Commodore and the home computers explosion. Subsequently, he narrated the documentary "Easy to learn, hard to master: the fate of Atari", thus becoming the official voice of the "8-bit Generation" documentary series. As of September 2020, he produces videos for Hackaday.

In 2021, Herd co-authored a book with Margaret Morabito, Back into the Storm: A Design Engineer's Story of Commodore Computers in the 1980s, in which he recounts inside stories about his and his team's experiences with designing computers for Commodore.
