= Raster interrupt =

Computer interrupt in home computers triggered by video output

A raster interrupt (also called a horizontal blank interrupt) is an interrupt signal in a legacy computer system which is used for display timing. It is usually, though not always, generated by a system's graphics chip as the scan lines of a frame are being readied to send to the monitor for display. The most basic implementation of a raster interrupt is the vertical blank interrupt.

Such an interrupt provides a mechanism for graphics registers to be changed mid-frame, so they have different values above and below the interrupt point. This allows a single-color object such as the background or the screen border to have multiple horizontal color bands, for example. Or, for a hardware sprite to be repositioned to give the illusion that there are more sprites than a system supports. The limitation is that changes only affect the portion of the display below the interrupt. They don't allow more colors or more sprites on a single scan line.

Modern protected mode operating systems generally do not support raster interrupts as access to hardware interrupts for unprivileged user programs could compromise the system stability. As their most important use case, the multiplexing of hardware sprites, is nowadays no longer relevant there exists no modern successor to raster interrupts.

== Systems supporting raster interrupts ==
Several popular home computers and video game consoles included graphics chips supporting raster interrupts or had features that could be combined to work like raster interrupts. The following list is not exhaustive.

=== Astrocade (two custom chips, 1977) ===
The Bally Astrocade supported a horizontal blank interrupt to select the four screen colors from a palette of 256 colors. The Astrocade did not support hardware sprites.

=== Atari 8-bit computers (ANTIC chip, 1979) ===
The ANTIC chip used by the Atari 8-bit computers includes display list interrupts (DLIs), which are triggered as the display is being drawn. The ANTIC chip itself is considerably powerful and inherently capable of many features which other systems require raster interrupts to duplicate. ANTIC can mix multiple graphics modes on the screen, display horizontal and vertical overscan graphics, and fine scroll selected horizontal regions. DLIs on the Atari are typically used to add additional color to the display and reuse Player/Missile graphics elements.

=== ColecoVision and MSX (TMS9918 chip, 1979) ===
The ColecoVision, an 8-bit game console released in 1982, as well as the MSX, a standardized home computer from 1983, utilized the Texas Instruments TMS9918. It includes a 'vertical interrupt' source to reposition the hardware sprites on the screen.

=== Commodore 64 (MOS Technology VIC-II chip, 1982) ===
The Commodore 64's and Commodore 128's MOS Technology VIC-II has a flexible raster interrupt system. Raster interrupts and CPU intervention are necessary to reuse sprites on the screen, mix graphics modes, and selectively scroll screen regions. Raster interrupts are also supported by the MOS Technology TED in the Plus/4 and Commodore 16.

=== Nintendo Entertainment System (PPU chip, 1983) ===
The Nintendo Entertainment System's PPU graphics chip does not support true raster interrupts - an interrupt can be set to trigger during the vertical blanking interval, but not at any arbitrary scan line - instead required polling of a "hit flag" that indicated when the first sprite was being drawn. Although early games like Super Mario Bros., Castlevania, and The Legend of Zelda managed to produce effective split-screen scrolling with this method, it is CPU-intensive. Some later cartridges incorporated MMC circuitry (most prominently Nintendo's MMC3 chip) that kept track of the PPU's address and data lines and generated raster interrupts.

=== IBM PCjr (Video Gate Array, 1984) ===
The IBM PCjr using the Video Gate Array graphics chip supported a 'vertical retrace interrupt' implemented as IRQ5. Later in 1984, IBM introduced the EGA graphics standard which also supported a vertical retrace interrupt, but implemented as XT IRQ2 and disabled by default. However, not all EGA cards implemented this feature and just very few programs utilizing EGA modes relied on it.

Modern GPUs have an IRQ registered on the main processor. Importantly, this is neither a vertical nor a horizontal 'blank interrupt' and it is handled by the device driver for the graphics card.

=== MSX2 (Yamaha V9938, 1985) ===
MSX2 computers feature a Yamaha V9938 graphics chip that, like the NES, supports 'vertical blank interrupts' but requires polling for 'horizontal blank interrupts'. It was commonly used to create split screens, mix multiple video modes together on one screen and to increase the number of unique colours on the screen beyond the official spec. Prominent usage examples are the Aleste series and Konami's Space Manbow.

=== Amiga (Copper chip, 1985) ===
The Amiga computers include a custom coprocessor called the Copper which is dedicated to servicing raster interrupts. The Copper runs a program of simple instructions directing it to wait for a specific vertical scan line and horizontal beam position, then update the contents of a custom chip hardware register. This is typically used for modifying display parameters, such as mixing display modes, reusing sprites, or changing color registers, but can also be used to trigger a CPU interrupt.

=== X68000 (VSOP + VINAS chip, 1987) ===
The X68000, a 16-bit home computer sold in Japan, has a flexible raster interrupt system to multiplex hardware sprites.

=== Game Boy (PPU chip, 1989) ===
The Game Boy's PPU has support for four raster interrupts: it can be set to trigger at the beginning of a specified scanline, at the end of scanlines (during horizontal blanking), at the beginning of all scanlines, or at the beginning of vertical blanking. Its drawback is that the same interrupt handler is used for the first three, requiring the use of "dispatching" code if more than one condition is used.

== See also ==
- List of home computers by video hardware
- Racing the Beam
- Vertical blank interrupt
