= Commodore 900 =

Prototype microcomputer

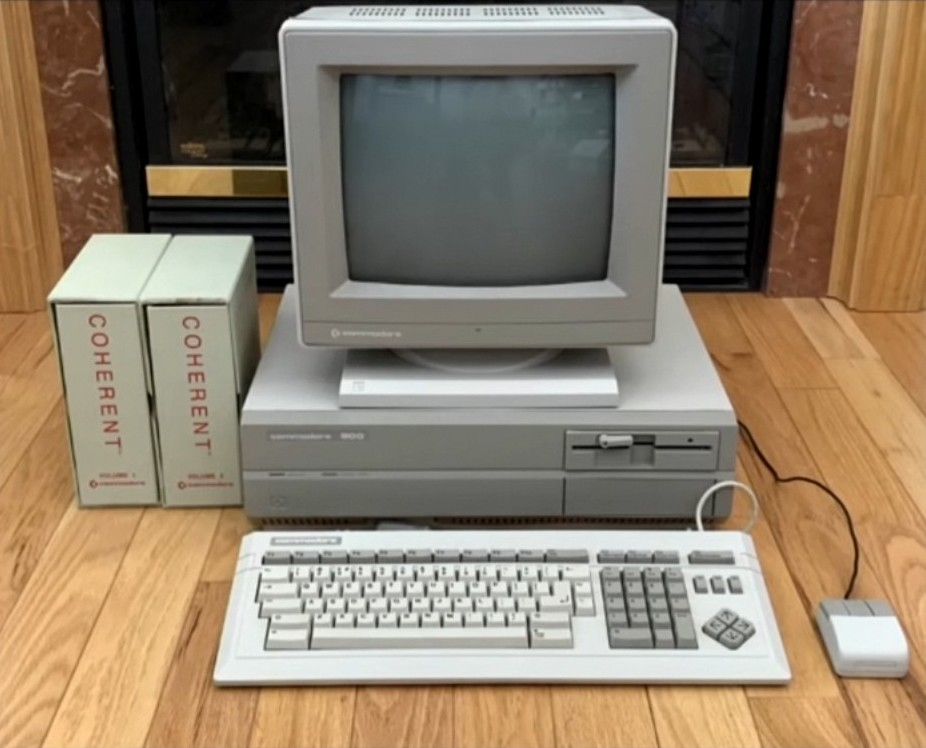
- A picture of a rare Commodore 900
- Also known as: C900, Z-8000, Z-Machine
- Developer: Commodore
- Manufacturer: Commodore
- Type: Desktop
- Units shipped: Fifty prototypes built
- Media: 1.2 MB 5.25" floppy disks
- Operating system: Coherent
- CPU: Zilog Z8001 @ 10 MHz
- Memory: 512 KB RAM
- Storage: 20 MB hard drive
- Display: 1024×800
- Graphics: MOS Technology 8563
- Sound: None
- Predecessor: Commodore PET

The Commodore 900 (also known as the C900, Z-8000, and Z-Machine) was a prototype microcomputer originally intended for business computing and, later, as an affordable UNIX workstation. It was to replace the aging PET/CBM families of personal computers that had found success in Europe as business machines. The project was initiated in 1983 by Commodore systems engineers Frank W. Hughes, Robert Russell, and Shiraz Shivji.

In early 1983, Commodore announced an agreement with Zilog to adopt the Z8000 family of processors for its next generation of computers, conferring rights to Commodore to manufacture these processors and for Zilog to manufacture various Commodore-designed integrated circuit products. Zilog was to manufacture components for Commodore's computers, allowing Commodore to expand its own semiconductor operation. Commodore had reportedly been developing its own 16-bit microprocessor, abandoning this effort to adopt the Z8000.

== Design ==
The C900 was a 16-bit computer based on the segmented version of the Zilog Z8000 CPU. Initial announcements indicated the use of a 10 MHz Z8001 processor, but earlier technical documentation suggested the use of a 6 MHz part and detailed the option of a Z8070 arithmetic processing unit (APU) running at 24 MHz. The specification as announced in 1984 featured 256 KB of RAM and a 10 MB hard drive, but subsequently settled on 512 KB of RAM and a 20 MB hard drive as the minimum configuration, with 40 MB and 67 MB hard drives offered as options. A minimum configuration system had been expected to provide only 128 KB of RAM and a 320 KB floppy drive, selling for under $1,000.

Two versions of the machine were developed: a workstation with 1024 × 800 pixel graphics and a multi-user system featuring a text-only display intended to act as a server for a number of connected character-based terminals. For the text-only configuration and for lower-resolution graphical output, the system employed the MOS Technology 8563 video controller, this supporting an 80 × 25 colour textual display or a 600 × 400 colour graphical display. The high-resolution display option employed 128 KB of dedicated video memory and featured hardware support for blitting operations, this being employed by a graphical environment featuring "multiple overlapping windows".

The C900 ran Coherent, a UNIX-like operating system, claimed in publicity as being "fully compatible with AT&T's Unix System V, version 5.2", although the Coherent system was generally regarded as merely providing a level of compatibility with Version 7 Unix. Some observers found the choice of an earlier form of Unix "surprising" given the availability of more recent versions and of Zilog's commitment among other manufacturers to promote System V as the industry standard for Unix. Onyx Systems, a pioneer of Z8000-based systems running Unix, had previously delivered ports of Version 7 Unix and Unix System III for their computers.

Manufacturing of the system was to commence in 1985 at Commodore International's West Germany plant, with availability in the United States announced for the third quarter of the same year, and with pricing starting from approximately $2,700. The machine was publicly demonstrated for the first time outside the US at the 1985 Hanover Fair, with interest in the product described as "overwhelming". Ultimately, only fifty prototypes were made and sold as development systems before the project was cancelled. The C900's case is similar to the Amiga 2000's but slightly larger.

== See also ==
- Amiga Unix
- Amiga 3000UX
