= MOS Technology 8568 =

Graphics processor for the Commodore 128DCR personal computer

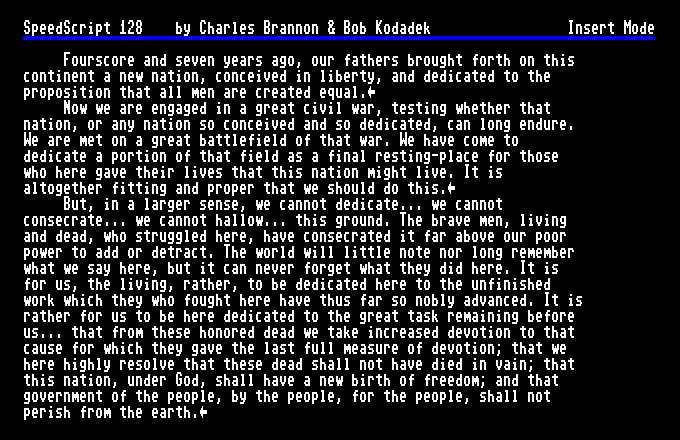
The VDC was designed with office suite applications in mind. Shown here is SpeedScript 128, a word processor.

The MOS Technology 8568 Video Display Controller (VDC) was the graphics processor responsible for the 80-column or RGBI display on the Commodore 128DCR personal computer. In the Commodore 128 service manual, this component was referred to as the "80 column CRT controller". The 8568 incorporated many of the features of the older 6545E monochrome CRT controller, with the addition of RGBI color.

== Features ==
- 80 × 25 characters text resolution.
- 720 × 700 pixels maximum video resolution.
- Interlaced up to 80 × 50 text, 640H × 480V bitmap.
- 3 character modes: standard, semigraphic, and graphic, double width and HiRes bitmap.
- Output: digital RGBI with 16 colors or 16 gray shades, plus limited monochrome composite.
- Other I/O features: interlace mode, horizontal and vertical scrolling, light pen input, hardware cursor, underline, blink, reverse video, 2 character sets of 256 each, update-ready interrupt.
- Memory: can access 64 KB of memory, programmable to interface either 4164/4464 or 4416 DRAM.
- Pin count: 48 pins, +5 Volt DC supply.

== 8568 versus 8563 ==
The original ("flat") Commodore 128 and the Commodore 128D (European plastic housing version) used the 8563 video controller to generate the 80-column display. The 8568 was essentially an updated version of the 8563, combining the latter's functionality with glue logic that had previously been implemented using discrete components located near the 8563. Unlike the 8563, the 8568 included an unused (in the C-128) active low interrupt request line (/INTR), which was asserted when the "ready" bit in the 8568's status register changed from 0 to 1. Reading the control register would automatically de-assert /INTR. Due to differences in pin assignments and circuit interfacing, the 8563 and 8568 are not electrically interchangeable.

== Display modes ==
The Commodore 128 had two video display modes, which were usually used singularly, but could be used simultaneously if the computer was connected to two compatible video monitors. The VIC-II chip, also found in the Commodore 64, was mapped directly into main memory—the video memory and CPUs (the 8502 and Z80A processors) shared a common 128 kB RAM, and the VIC-II control registers were accessed as memory locations (that is, they were memory mapped).

== Accessing the VDC ==
Unlike the VIC-II, the 8568 had its own local video RAM, 64K in the C-128DCR model (sold in North America) and, depending on the date of manufacture of the particular machine, either 16 or 64K in the C-128D model (marketed in Europe). Addressing the VDC's internal registers and dedicated video memory must be accomplished by indirect means. First, the program must tell the VDC which of its 37 internal registers is to be accessed. Next, the program must wait until the VDC is ready for access, after which a read or write on the selected internal register may be performed. The following code is typical of a register read:

         ldx #regnum       ;VDC register to access
         stx $d600         ;write to control register
 loop    bit $d600         ;check bit 7 of status register
         bpl loop          ;VDC not ready
         lda $d601         ;read from VDC register
         ...

The following code is typical of a register write operation:

         ldx #regnum       ;VDC register to write to
         stx $d600         ;write to control register
 loop    bit $d600         ;check bit 7 of status register
         bpl loop          ;VDC not ready
         sta $d601         ;write to VDC register
         ...

Owing to this somewhat cumbersome method of controlling the 8568, the maximum possible frame rate in bit-mapped mode is generally too slow for arcade-style action video games, in which bit-intensive manipulation of the display is required.

The final versions of the 8568 had the revision codes R9a or R9b appended to the part number, apparently indicating undocumented improvements.

== Register listing ==
This information was adapted from the Commodore 128 Programmer's Reference Guide

Register	Hexadecimal	Bit 7	Bit 6	Bit 5	Bit 4	Bit 3	Bit 2	Bit 1	Bit 0	Description
0	$00	HT7	HT6	HT5	HT4	HT3	HT2	HT1	HT0	Horizontal Total
1	$01	HD7	HD6	HD5	HD4	HD3	HD2	HD1	HD0	Horizontal Displayed
2	$02	HP7	HP6	HP5	HP4	HP3	HP2	HP1	HP0	Horizontal Sync Position
3	$03	VW3	VW2	VW1	VW0	HW3	HW2	HW1	HW0	Vertical/Horizontal Sync Width
4	$04	VT7	VT6	VT5	VT4	VT3	VT2	VT1	VT0	Vertical Total
5	$05	—	—	—	VA4	VA3	VA2	VA1	VA0	Vertical Adjust
6	$06	VD7	VD6	VD5	VD4	VD3	VD2	VD1	VD0	Vertical Displayed
7	$07	VP7	VP6	VP5	VP4	VP3	VP2	VP1	VP0	Vertical Sync Position
8	$08	—	—	—	—	—	—	IM1	IM0	Interlace Mode
9	$09	—	—	—	—	CTV4	CTV3	CTV2	CTV1	Character Total Vertical
10	$0A	—	CM1	CM0	CS4	CS3	CS2	CS1	CS0	Cursor Mode, Cursor Start Scan Line
11	$0B	—	—	—	CE4	CE3	CE2	CE1	CE0	Cursor End Scan Line
12	$0C	DS15	DS14	DS13	DS12	DS11	DS10	DS9	DS8	Display Start Address High Byte
13	$0D	DS7	DS6	DS5	DS4	DS3	DS2	DS1	DS0	Display Start Address Low Byte
14	$0E	CP15	CP14	CP13	CP12	CP11	CP10	CP9	CP8	Cursor Position High Byte
15	$0F	CP7	CP6	CP5	CP4	CP3	CP2	CP1	CP0	Cursor Position Low Byte
16	$10	LPV7	LPV6	LPV5	LPV4	LPV3	LPV2	LPV1	LPV0	Light Pen Vertical Position
17	$11	LPH7	LPH6	LPH5	LPH4	LPH3	LPH2	LPH1	LPH0	Light Pen Horizontal Position
18	$12	UA15	UA14	UA13	UA12	UA11	UA10	UA9	UA8	Update Address High Byte
19	$13	UA7	UA6	UA5	UA4	UA3	UA2	UA1	UA0	Update Address Low Byte
20	$14	AA15	AA14	AA13	AA12	AA11	AA10	AA9	AA8	Attribute Start Address High Byte
21	$15	AA7	AA6	AA5	AA4	AA3	AA2	AA1	AA0	Attribute Start Address Low Byte
22	$16	CTH3	CTH2	CTH1	CTH0	CDH3	CDH2	CDH1	CDH0	Character Total Horizontal, Character Display Horizontal
23	$17	—	—	—	CDV4	CDV3	CDV2	CDV1	CDV0	Character Display Vertical
24	$18	COPY	RVS	CBRATE	VSS4	VSS3	VSS2	VSS1	VSS0	Vertical Smooth Scrolling
25	$19	TEXT	ATR	SEMI	DBL	HSS3	HSS2	HSS1	HSS0	Horizontal Smooth Scrolling
26	$1A	FG3	FG2	FG1	FG0	BG3	BG2	BG1	BG0	Foreground/Background color
27	$1B	AI7	AI6	AI5	AI4	AI3	AI2	AI1	AI0	Address Increment per Row
28	$1C	CB15	CB14	CB13	RAM	—	—	—	—	Character Base Address
29	$1D	—	—	—	UL4	UL3	UL2	UL1	UL0	Underline Scan Line
30	$1E	WC7	WC6	WC5	WC4	WC3	WC2	WC1	WC0	Word Count
31	$1F	DA7	DA6	DA5	DA4	DA3	DA2	DA1	DA0	Data Register
32	$20	BA15	BA14	BA13	BA12	BA11	BA10	BA9	BA8	Block Start Address High Byte
33	$21	BA7	BA6	BA5	BA4	BA3	BA2	BA1	BA0	Block Start Address Low Byte
34	$22	DEB7	DEB6	DEB5	DEB4	DEB3	DEB2	DEB1	DEB0	Display Enable Begin
35	$23	DEE7	DEE6	DEE5	DEE4	DEE3	DEE2	DEE1	DEE0	Display Enable End
36	$24	—	—	—	—	DRR3	DRR2	DRR1	DRR0	DRAM Refresh Rate
37	$25	HSYNC	VSYNC	—	—	—	—	—	—	SYNC Polarity (undocumented)

== Notes ==
1. In Commodore 128 terminology, the VIC-II display was called the 40-column display, and the VDC, 80-column, due to the number of columns of fixed-pitch text that could be natively displayed.
2. Commodore service manual 314001-08 (1987).
3. The 8563/8568 hardware is always visible on the address and data buses regardless of which mode the C-128 is operating in. Hence it is possible to generate an 80-column display while running in C-64 compatibility mode. There is, of course, no C-64 operating system support.
