= Commodore 128 =

Home computer released in 1985

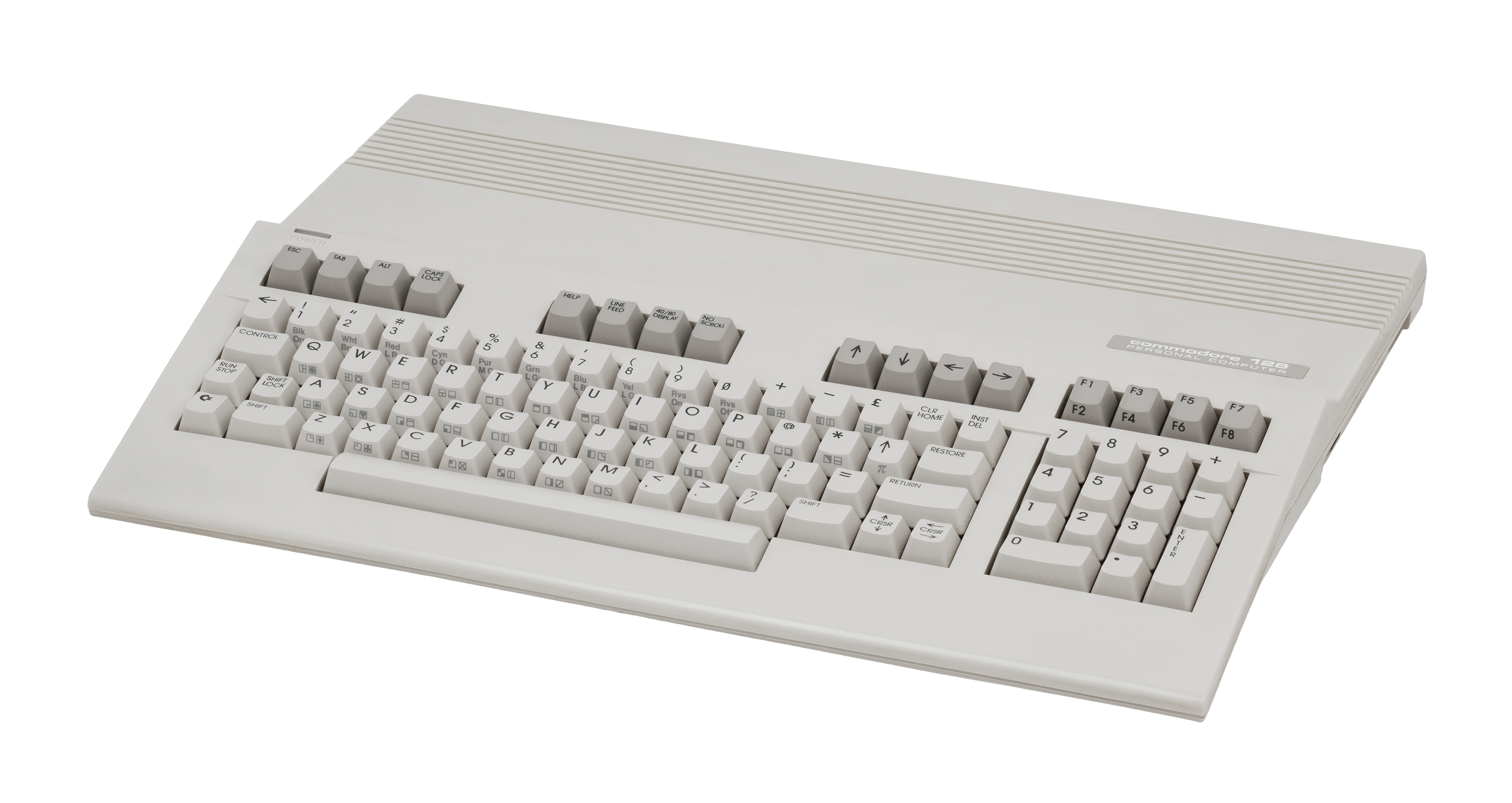
- Manufacturer: Commodore Business Machines (CBM)
- Type: Home computer
- Released: January 1985; 41 years ago
- Introductory price: US$299 (equivalent to $900 in 2025)
- Discontinued: 1989; 37 years ago
- Units sold: 2.5 million worldwide
- Operating system: Commodore BASIC 7.0; Digital Research CP/M 3.0; GEOS
- CPU: MOS 8502 @ 1–2 MHz; Zilog Z80A, or Zilog Z80B @ 4 MHz
- Memory: 128 KB (standard), 640 KB (with 512 KB REU expansion RAM)
- Graphics: VIC-II E (320×200, 16 colors, sprites, raster interrupt), MOS 8563 (RGBI 640×200 16 colors, blitter)
- Sound: SID 6581/8580 (3× Osc, 4× Wave, Filter, ADSR, Ring)
- Predecessor: Commodore 64

The Commodore 128, also known as the C128, is the last 8-bit home computer that was commercially released by Commodore Business Machines (CBM). Introduced in January 1985 at the CES in Las Vegas, it appeared three years after its predecessor, the Commodore 64, the bestselling computer of the 1980s. Approximately 2.5 million C128s were sold during its four-year production run.

The C128 is a significantly expanded successor to the C64, with nearly full compatibility. It is housed in a redesigned case with an improved keyboard including a numeric keypad and function keys. Memory was enlarged to 128 KB of RAM in two 64 KB banks. A separate graphics chip provided 80-column color video output in addition to the original C64 modes. It also included a Zilog Z80 CPU which allows the C128 to run CP/M, as an alternative to the usual Commodore BASIC environment. The huge CP/M software library, coupled with the C64's software library, gave the C128 one of the broadest ranges of available software among its competitors.

The primary hardware designer of the C128 was Bil Herd, who had worked on the Plus/4. Other hardware engineers were Dave Haynie and Frank Palaia, while the IC design work was done by Dave DiOrio. The main Commodore system software was developed by Fred Bowen and Terry Ryan, while the CP/M subsystem was developed by Von Ertwine.

The C128 released in the United Kingdom on 25 July 1985.

== Design ==
The BASIC prompt for the Commodore 128 in 40-column mode, running Commodore BASIC V7.0

The C128's complex architecture includes four differently accessed kinds of RAM (128 KB main RAM, 16–64 KB VDC video RAM, 2 kNibbles VIC-II Color RAM, 2-KB floppy-drive RAM on C128Ds, 0, 128 or 512 KB REU RAM), two or three CPUs (main: 8502, Z80 for CP/M; the 128D also incorporates a 6502 in the disk drive), and two different video chips (VIC-IIe and VDC) for its various operational modes.

The C128 does not perform a system RAM test on power-up like previous Commodore machines. Instead of the single 6510 microprocessor of the C64, the C128 incorporates a two-CPU design. The primary CPU, the 8502, is a slightly improved version of the 6510, capable of being clocked at 2 MHz. The second CPU is a Zilog Z80 which is used to run CP/M software, as well as to initiate operating-mode selection at boot time.

The C128's keyboard includes four cursor keys, Alt, Help, Esc and Tab ↹ keys and a numeric keypad. None of these were present on the C64 which had only two cursor keys, requiring the use of the ⇧ Shift key to move the cursor up or left. This alternate arrangement was retained on the 128, for use under C64 mode. The lack of a numeric keypad, Alt , and Esc on the C64 was an issue with some CP/M productivity software when used with the C64's Z80 cartridge. A keypad was requested by many C64 owners who spent long hours entering machine language type-in programs. Many of the added keys matched counterparts present on the IBM PC's keyboard and made the new computer more attractive to business software developers. While the 128's 40-column mode closely duplicates that of the C64, an extra 1K of color RAM is made available to the programmer, as it is multiplexed through memory address 1.

The design of the C128's power supply is different from that used with the C64. Although it is much larger, the new power supply is equipped with cooling vents and a replaceable fuse.

Early versions of the C128 occasionally experience temperature-related reliability issues due to the use of an RF shield over the main circuit board. The shield was equipped with fingers that contacted the tops of the major chips, ostensibly causing the shield to act as a large heat sink. A combination of poor contact between the shield and the chips, the inherently limited heat conductivity of plastic chip packages, as well as the relatively poor thermal conductivity of the shield itself, resulted in overheating and failure in some cases. The SID sound chip is particularly vulnerable in this respect. The most common remedy is to remove the shield, which Commodore had added late in development to comply with FCC radio-frequency regulations.

== Modes ==
The C128 has three operating modes. C128 Mode (native mode) runs at 1 or 2 MHz with the 8502 CPU and has both 40- and 80-column text modes available. CP/M Mode uses both the Z80 and the 8502, and is able to function in both 40- and 80-column text mode. C64 Mode is nearly 100 percent compatible with the earlier computer. Selection of these modes is implemented via the Z80 chip. The Z80 controls the bus on initial boot-up and checks to see if there is a CP/M disk in the drive, if there are any C64/C128 cartridges present, or if the Commodore key (which serves as the C64-mode selector) is being depressed on boot-up. Based on these conditions, it will switch to the appropriate mode of operation.

=== C128 ===
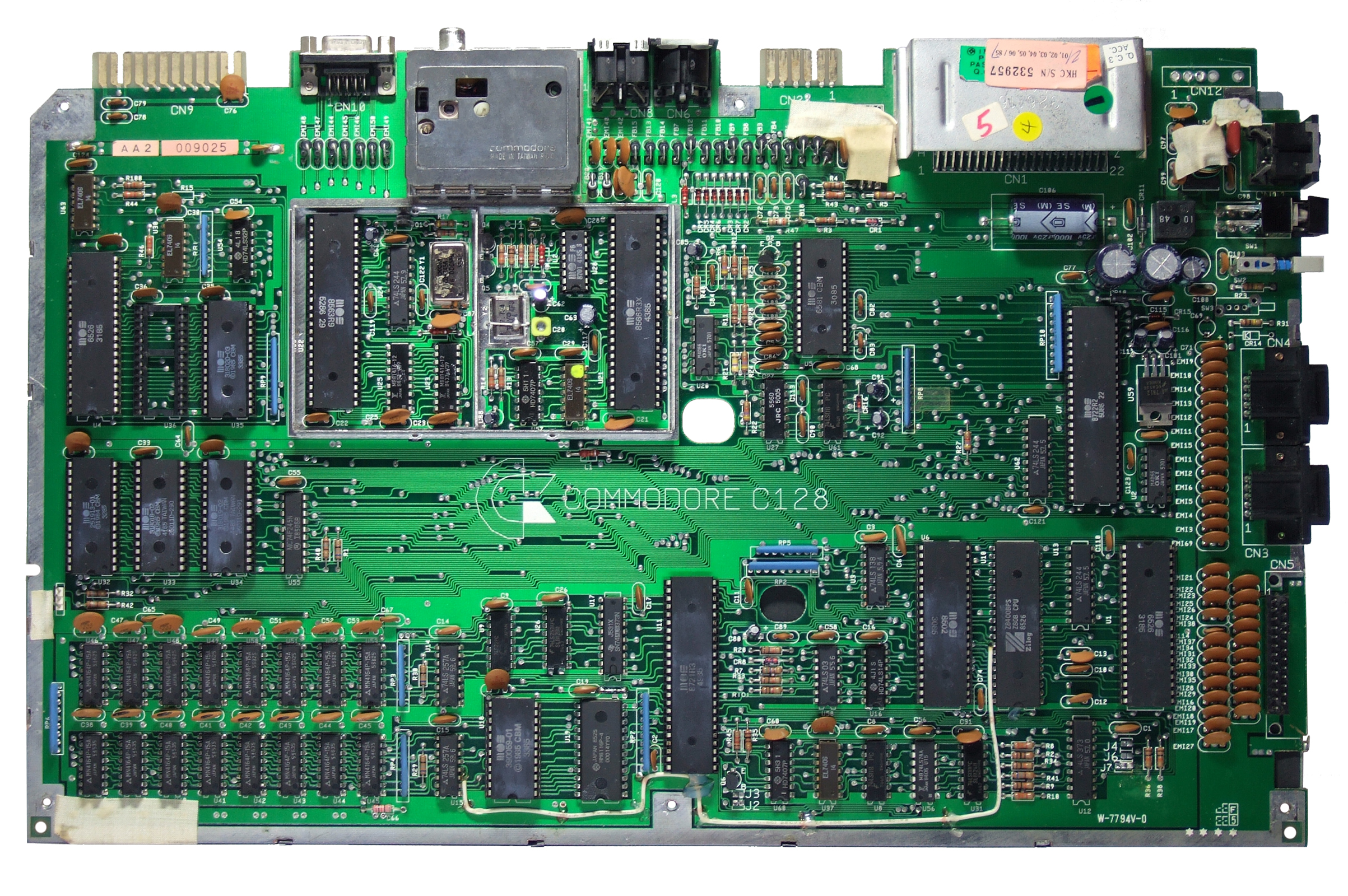
C128 main board

In 1984, a year before the release of the Commodore 128, Commodore released the Plus/4. Although targeted at a low-end business market that could not afford the relatively high cost and training requirements of early IBM PC compatibles, it was perceived by the Commodore press as a follow-up to the 64 and would be expected to improve upon that model's capabilities. While the C64's graphics and sound capabilities were generally considered excellent, the response to the Plus/4 was one of disappointment. Upon the Plus/4's introduction, repeated recommendations were made in the Commodore press for a new computer called the "C-128" with increased RAM capacity, an 80-column display as was standard in business computers, a new BASIC programming language that made it easy for programmers to use the computer's graphics and sound without resorting to PEEK and POKEs, a new disk drive that improved upon the 1541's notoriously slow default transfer rate (without fastloader), as well as total C64 compatibility.

The designers of the C128 succeeded in addressing most of these concerns. A new chip, the VDC, provides the C128 with an 80-column color CGA-compatible display (also called RGBI for red-green-blue plus intensity). The then-new 8502 microprocessor is completely backward-compatible with the C64's 6510, but can run at double the speed if desired. The C64's Commodore BASIC 2.0 was replaced with BASIC 7.0, which includes structured programming commands from the Plus/4's BASIC 3.5, as well as keywords designed specifically to take advantage of the machine's capabilities. A sprite editor and machine language monitor were added. The screen-editor part of the Kernal was further improved to support an insert mode and other features accessed through ESC-key combinations, as well as a rudimentary windowing feature, and was relocated to a separate ROM. The VIC-II chip which controls the 40-column display can only operate at 1 MHz, so the 40-column display appears jumbled in FAST mode. In 80-column mode the editor takes advantage of VDC features to provide blinking and underlined text, activated through escape codes, in addition to the standard Commodore reverse text. The C128's 80-column mode can display lowercase characters along with PETSCII graphics characters; 40-column mode is subject to the same "upper- and lowercase" or "uppercase-plus-graphics" restriction as earlier Commodores. The 40- and 80-column modes are independent and both can be active at the same time. A programmer with both a composite and RGB display can use one of the screens as a "scratchpad" or for rudimentary multiple buffer support. The active display can be switched with ESC+X. A hardware reset button was added to the system. The keyboard, however, was not switched to the Selectric layout as had become standard, instead retaining the same ADM-3A-derived design as on Commodore's prior models.

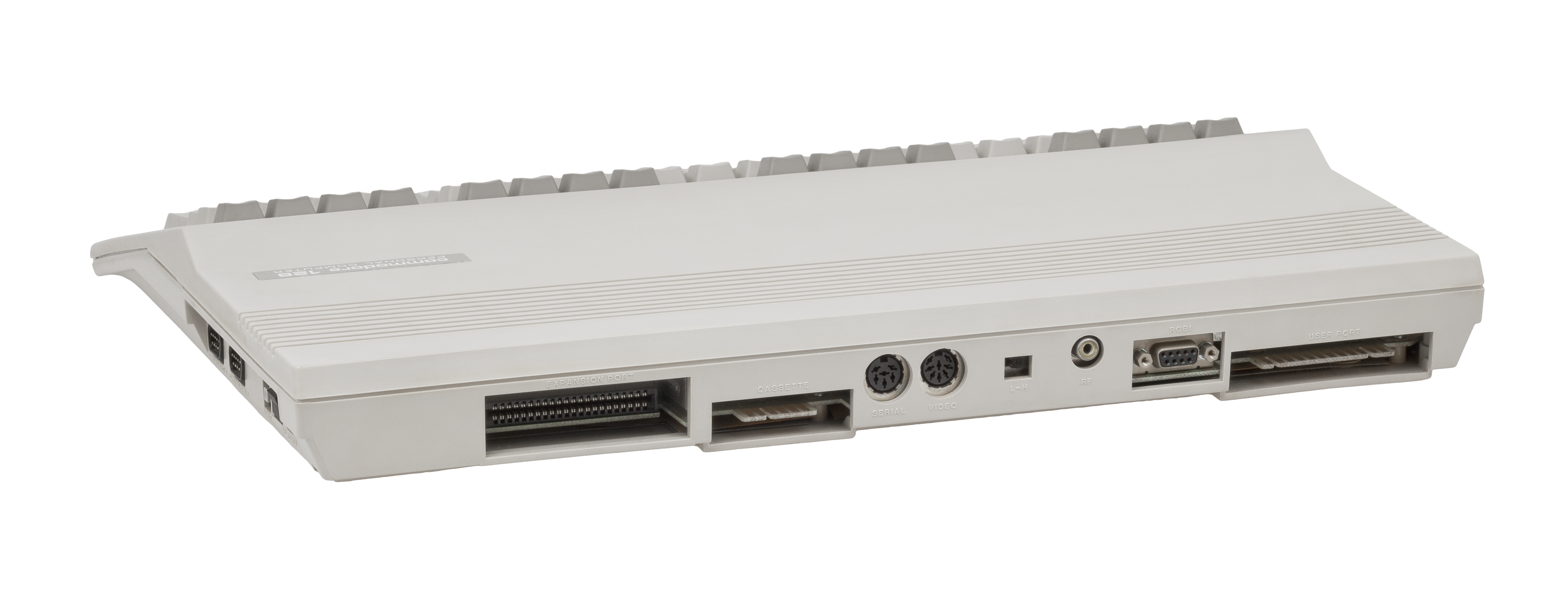
The back of the Commodore 128

NTSC C128s will work with any CGA-type monitor (TTL RGB @ 15 kHz/60 Hz) such as the IBM 5153. However, PAL models of the C128 operate at 50 Hz and are not compatible with most CGA monitors, which expect a 60 Hz refresh rate.

Two new disk drives were introduced in conjunction with the C128: the short-lived single-sided 1570 and the double-sided 1571. A dual-disk 1572 model was announced but never produced. Later on, the 3.5-inch 1581 was introduced. The 1581 drive also has more on-board RAM than its predecessors, making it possible to open a larger number of files at one time. BASIC 7.0 includes DLOAD and DSAVE commands to support loading and saving to disk without using the ,8 or other device number, and also a DIRECTORY command that reads a disk's catalog information directly to screen memory without overwriting BASIC memory as in BASIC 2.0. In addition, the C128 introduces auto-booting of disk software, a feature standard on most personal computers, but absent from Commodore machines up to that point. Users no longer have to type LOAD"*",8,1. BASIC also added a COLLECT command for removing "splat" files (files that were not closed properly and truncated to zero length).

All 1571 drives will normally start up in native mode on the C128. If the user switches to C64 mode by typing GO 64, the drive remains in native mode. But if C64 mode is activated by holding the Commodore key down when powering up, the 1571 then goes into 1541 mode. This routine is necessary for software that performs low-level drive access.

The C128 has twice the RAM of the C64, a far higher proportion of which is available for BASIC programming, due to the new MMU bank-switching chip. This allows BASIC program code to be stored separately from variables, greatly enhancing the machine's ability to handle complex programs, speeding garbage collection and easing debugging for the programmer. An executing program can be STOPped, its code edited, variable values inspected or altered in direct mode, and program execution resumed with the variable table intact using BASIC's GOTO command. Although other BASICs support the CONT command to restart execution without clearing variables, editing any code causes them to be cleared. Different memory configurations can be loaded using BASIC's BANK command.

BASIC 7.0 has a full complement of graphics and sound-handling commands, as well as BASIC 4.0's disk commands and improved garbage cleanup, and support for structured programming via IF...THEN...ELSE, DO...WHILE, and WHILE...WEND loops.

On the downside, BASIC 7.0 ran considerably slower than BASIC 2.0 unless 2 MHz mode was used due to its 28 KB size (a 250% increase over BASIC 2.0) and having to bank switch to access program variables and BASIC program text (if greater than 16k in length).

The 128's ROM contains an easter egg: Entering the command SYS 32800,123,45,6 in native mode reveals a screen with a listing of the machine's main developers followed by the message Link arms, don't make them." Also, entering the keywords QUIT or OFF will produce an ?UNIMPLEMENTED COMMAND ERROR. These commands are holdovers from the BASIC interpreter intended for a planned but never-produced LCD portable computer and had been intended to exit from the BASIC interpreter and to ignore keyboard input during sensitive program execution, respectively.

The C128's greater hardware capabilities, especially the increased RAM, screen display resolution, and serial bus speed, made it a more capable platform than the C64 for running the GEOS graphical operating system.

=== CP/M ===
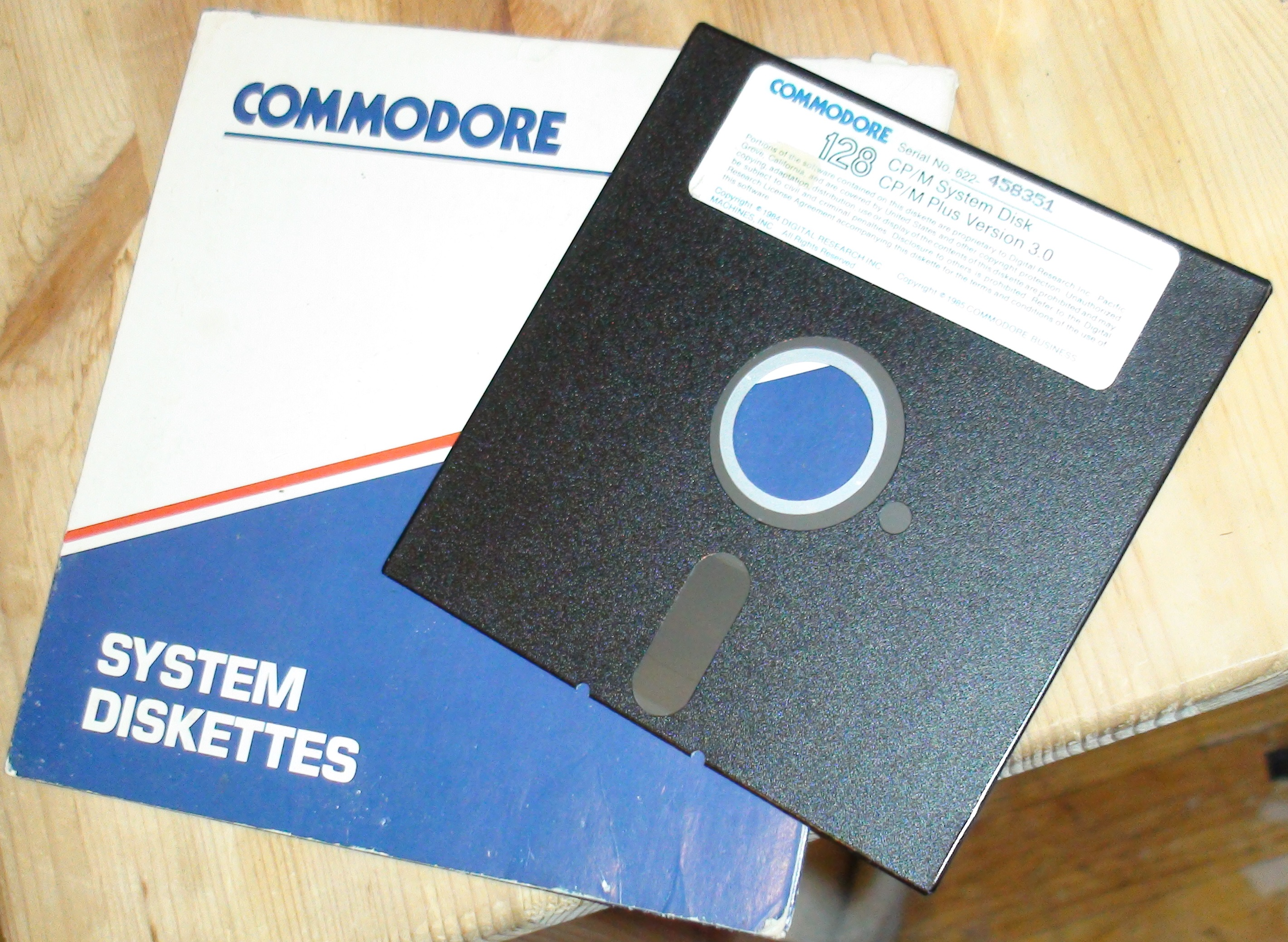
Using CP/M mode requires use of a boot diskette. The diskette was included with the computer, which did not include a disk drive.

The second of the C128's two CPUs is the Zilog Z80, which allows the C128 to run CP/M. The C128 was shipped with CP/M 3.0 (a.k.a. CP/M Plus, which is backward-compatible with CP/M 2.2) and ADM31/3A terminal emulation. A CP/M cartridge had been available for the C64, but it was expensive and of limited use since the 1541 drive cannot read the MFM-formatted disks that CP/M software was distributed on. Software had to be made available on Commodore-specific disks formatted using the GCR encoding scheme. Commodore made versions of PerfectCalc and the EMACS-derived PerfectWriter available, and Commodore user groups sometimes had a selection of CP/M diskettes, but the limited software availability negated one of CP/M's chief attractions—its huge software library. In addition, the cartridges only work on early model C64s from 1982 and are incompatible with later units. Since they were also incompatible with the C128, the design team decided to support CP/M by putting the Z80 on the main system board.

The C128 runs CP/M noticeably slower than most dedicated CP/M systems, as the Z80 processor runs at an effective speed of only 2 MHz. This was because the C128's system bus was designed around the 65xx CPUs. These CPUs handle data and memory addressing very differently from the Z80. CP/M also ran more slowly for several reasons, such as needing to pass control to the 8502 for any I/O or interrupt processing. For these reasons, few users actually ran CP/M software on the C128.

When the C128 is powered on, the Z80 is active first and executes a small boot loader ROM at $0-$FFF to check for the presence of a CP/M disk. If one is not detected, control is passed to the 8502 and C128 native mode is started.

CP/M mode in practice requires a 1571 or 1581 drive to be useful, since a 1541 cannot read MFM disks and will run much slower due to not supporting the C128's burst mode. CP/M boot disks nonetheless must be in the drive's native GCR format; MFM disks cannot be booted from, only read once the user is already in CP/M. This is because the code necessary to operate the drive in MFM mode is loaded as part of the boot process. In addition, 80-column mode is generally required since most CP/M software expects an 80-column screen. The C128 emulates an ADM-3A terminal in CP/M mode, so software will have to be set up for that. Aside from the standard ADM-3A terminal commands, a number of extra ones are available to use the VIC-II and VDC's features, including setting the text and background color. The CP/M command interpreter (although not application software) includes a safeguard to prevent the user from issuing a control code to make the text and background the same color, which would render text invisible and force the user to reset the computer. If this happens, it will default to a gray background with brown text.

CP/M mode is very different from the operating environments familiar to Commodore users. While Commodore DOS is built into the ROM of Commodore disk drives and is usually accessed through BASIC, CP/M requires the use of a boot diskette and requires entry of terse commands inherited from minicomputer platforms. CP/M programs tend to lack the user-friendly nature of most Commodore applications.

In CP/M mode, it is possible to run MBASIC, Microsoft's release of BASIC-80 for CP/M. Compared with the native mode BASIC 7.0, MBASIC is terse and limited in its capabilities, requiring the use of terminal-style key combinations to edit program lines or move the text cursor and lacking any sound or graphics features. Moreover, Commodore BASIC has 40-bit floating point which serves as a middle ground between MBASIC's 32-bit floating point and 64-bit double precision variables. MBASIC also offers only 34k of free program space against BASIC 7.0's approximately 90k.

The CP/M CBIOS (the part of CP/M that interfaces with the hardware) does not directly interface with the hardware like on most CP/M implementations; rather, it calls the kernal routines for interrupt handling and I/O—when the kernel needs to be used, the Z80 uses routines at $FFD0-$FFEF to pass parameter data to the 8502, which is then activated and the Z80 deactivated. After the kernel routine is finished executing, control is passed back to the Z80. It was reported that the programmer in charge of porting CP/M to the C128 had intended to have the CBIOS interface with the hardware directly in Z80 machine language, but had great difficulty with the VDU chips as they were prone to overheating and self-destructing. The VDU also underwent numerous hardware revisions while the C128 was in development and the CP/M programmer was unable to get his code working properly, so the C128 engineering team requested instead that he simply rewrite the CBIOS to pass function calls to the 8502.

=== C64 ===
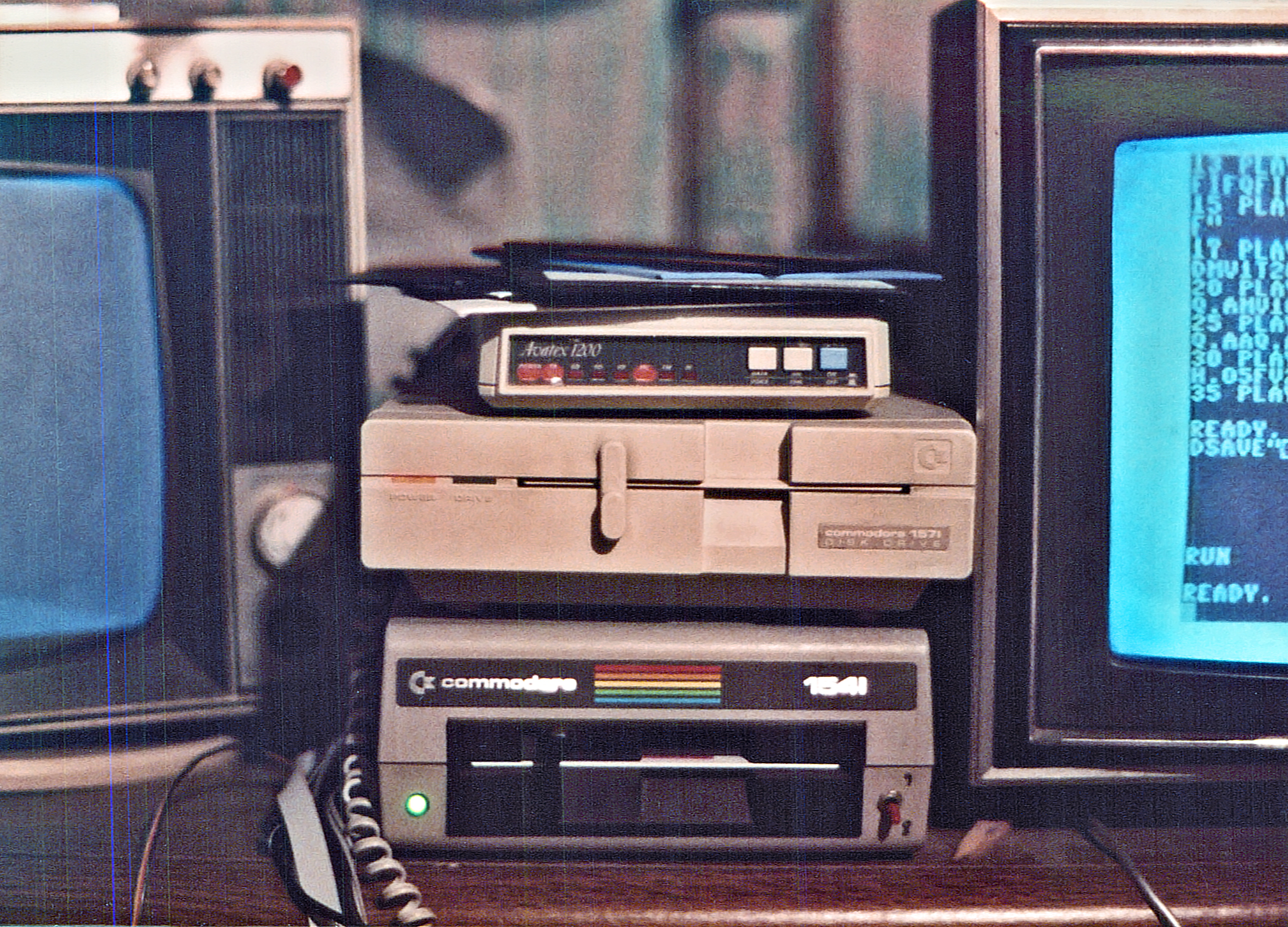
Photo from the 1980s showing a C128 setup with two disk drives and two monitors displaying the independent 40- and 80-column screens. Many users continued to use the 1541 inherited from their C64 system as a second drive.

By incorporating the original C64 BASIC and Kernal ROMs in their entirety (16 KB total), the C128 achieves almost 100 percent compatibility with the Commodore 64. The C64 mode can be accessed in three ways:

1. Holding down the Commodore-logo key when booting.
2. Entering the GO 64 command, then responding Y to the ARE YOU SURE? prompt, in BASIC 7.0.
3. Booting with a C64 cartridge plugged in.

Grounding the cartridge port's /EXROM and/or /GAME lines will cause the computer to automatically start up in C64 mode. This feature faithfully duplicates the C64's behavior when a cartridge (such as Simons' BASIC) is plugged into the port and asserts either of these lines but, unlike an actual C64, where the memory-map-changing action of these lines is implemented directly in hardware, the C128's Z80 firmware startup code polls these lines on power-up and then switches modes as necessary. C128 native-mode cartridges are recognized and started by the kernel polling defined locations in the memory map.

C64 mode almost exactly duplicates the features of a hardware C64. The MMU, Z80, and IEC burst mode are disabled in C64 mode, however all other C128 hardware features including the VDU and 2 MHz mode are still accessible. The extended keys of the C128 keyboard may be read from machine language, although the kernal routines only recognize the keys that exist on the C64. A few games are capable of detecting if a C128 is running and switching to 2 MHz mode during the vertical retrace for faster performance.

On North American C128s, when in C64 mode, even the character (font) ROM changes from that of C128 mode. Early C128 prototypes had a single ROM, with a slightly improved character set over that of the C64. But some C64 programs read the character ROM as data, and will fail in various ways on a C128. Thus, the C128 was given a double-sized character ROM, which delivers the C128 font in C128 mode, and the C64 font in C64 mode. International models of the C128 use the unmodified C64 font in both modes, since the second half of the character ROM is instead dedicated to the international font (containing such things as accented characters or German umlauts).

Some of the few C64 programs that fail on a C128 will run correctly when the ⇪ Caps Lock key is pressed down (or the ASCII/National key on international C128 models). This has to do with the larger built-in I/O port of the C128's CPU. Whereas the SHIFT LOCK key found on both C64 and C128 is simply a mechanical latch for the left ⇧ Shift key, the ⇪ Caps Lock key on the C128 can be read via the 8502's built-in I/O port. A few C64 programs are confused by this extra I/O bit; keeping the ⇪ Caps Lock key in the down position will force the I/O line low, matching the C64's configuration and resolving the issue.

A handful of C64 programs write to $D030 (53296), often as part of a loop initializing the VIC-II chip registers. This memory-mapped register, unused in the C64, determines the system clock rate. Since this register is fully functional in C64 mode, an inadvertent write can scramble the 40-column display by switching the CPU over to 2–MHz, at which clock rate the VIC-II video processor cannot produce a coherent display. Fortunately, few programs suffer from this flaw. In July 1986, COMPUTE!'s Gazette published a type-in program that exploited this difference by using a raster interrupt to enable fast mode when the bottom of the visible screen was reached, and then disable it when screen rendering began again at the top. By using the higher clock rate during the vertical blank period, standard video display is maintained while increasing overall execution speed by about 20 percent.

A few C64 programs would lack sound effects and music because on a C64 the SID chip $D4xx memory page was also mirrored on $D5xx, $D6xx and $D7xx pages, while on a C128 it was only accessible through $D4xx page. This is not a common issue, since the C64 reference guide only describes registers in $D4xx in details while describing $D5xx-$D8xx just as "SID IMAGES", making most programs accessing them through $D4xx page and hence have the sound getting played as intended on a C128.

An easy way to differentiate between a hardware C64 and a C128 operating in C64 mode, typically used from within a running program, is to write a value different from $FF (255) to memory address $D02F (53295), a register which is used to decode the extra keys of the C128 (the numerical keypad and some other keys). On the C64 this memory location will always contain the value $FF no matter what is written to it, but on a C128 in C64 mode the value of the location—a memory-mapped register—can be changed. Thus, checking the location's value after writing to it will reveal the actual hardware platform.

=== RAM setup ===
To handle the relatively large amounts of ROM and RAM (tenfold the size of 8502's 64 KB address space) the C128 uses the 8722 MMU chip to create different memory maps, in which different combinations of RAM and ROM would appear according to bit patterns written into the MMU's configuration register at memory address $FF00. Another feature of the memory management unit is to allow relocation of zero page and the stack.

Although the C128 can theoretically support 256k of RAM in four blocks, the PCB has no provisions to add this extra RAM, nor can the MMU actually access more than 128k. Therefore, if the MMU is programmed to access blocks 2 or 3, all that results is a mirror of the RAM in blocks 0 and 1.

Since the I/O registers and system ROMs can be disabled or enabled freely, as well as being locatable in either RAM bank and the VIC-II set to use either bank for its memory space, up to 256 memory configurations are possible, although the vast majority of them are useless (for example, unworkable combinations like the kernal ROM in bank 0 and the I/O registers in bank 1 are possible). Because of this, BASIC's BANK statement allows the user to select 15 of the most useful arrangements, with the power-on default being Bank 15. This default places the system ROMs, I/O registers, and BASIC program text in block 0, with block 1 being used by BASIC program variables. BASIC program text and variables can extend all the way to $FFEF. But since block 0 contains the ROMs and I/O registers from $4000 onward, BASIC uses an internal switching routine to read program text higher than $3FFF.

The top and bottom 1k of RAM ($0–$3FF and $FF00-$FFFF) are "shared" RAM, visible from both blocks. The MMU allows either to be expanded in increments up to 16k. The $0–$3FF range contains the zero page and stack while $FF00-$FFFF contains the MMU registers and reset vectors. These areas are always shared and cannot be switched to non-shared RAM. Shared RAM is always the opposite bank from the one currently being used by the CPU, thus if bank 0 is selected, any read or write to shared RAM will refer to the corresponding locations in bank 1 and vice versa. The VIC-II can be set to use either RAM bank and from there, its normal 16k window. While on the C64, the VIC-II can only see the character ROM in banks 2 and 4 of its memory space, the C128, on the other hand, makes it possible to enable or disable the character ROM for any VIC-II bank via the register at $1. Also, there are two sets of color RAM—one visible to the CPU, the other to the VIC-II and the user may select what chip sees what.

In CP/M mode, the Program Segment Prefix and Transient Program Area reside in Bank 1 and the I/O registers and CP/M system code in Bank 0.

The C128's RAM is expandable from the standard 128 KB to 256, 512 or even 1,024 KB, either by using commercial memory expansion modules, or by making one based on schematics available on the internet.

Commodore's RAM Expansion Units use an external 8726 DMA controller to transfer data between the C128's RAM and the RAM in the expansion unit.

== C128D ==
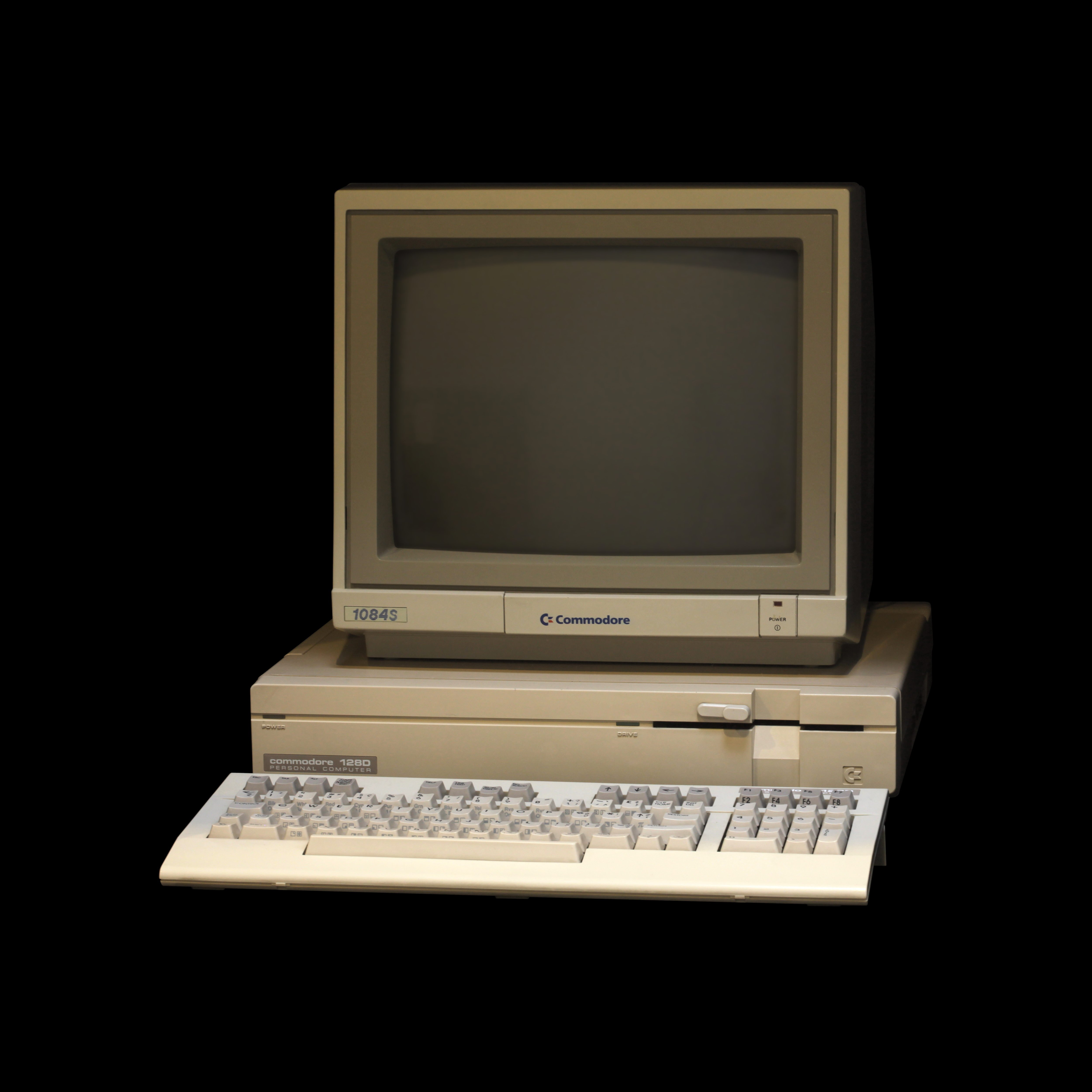
Commodore 128D on display at the Musée Bolo, EPFL, Switzerland

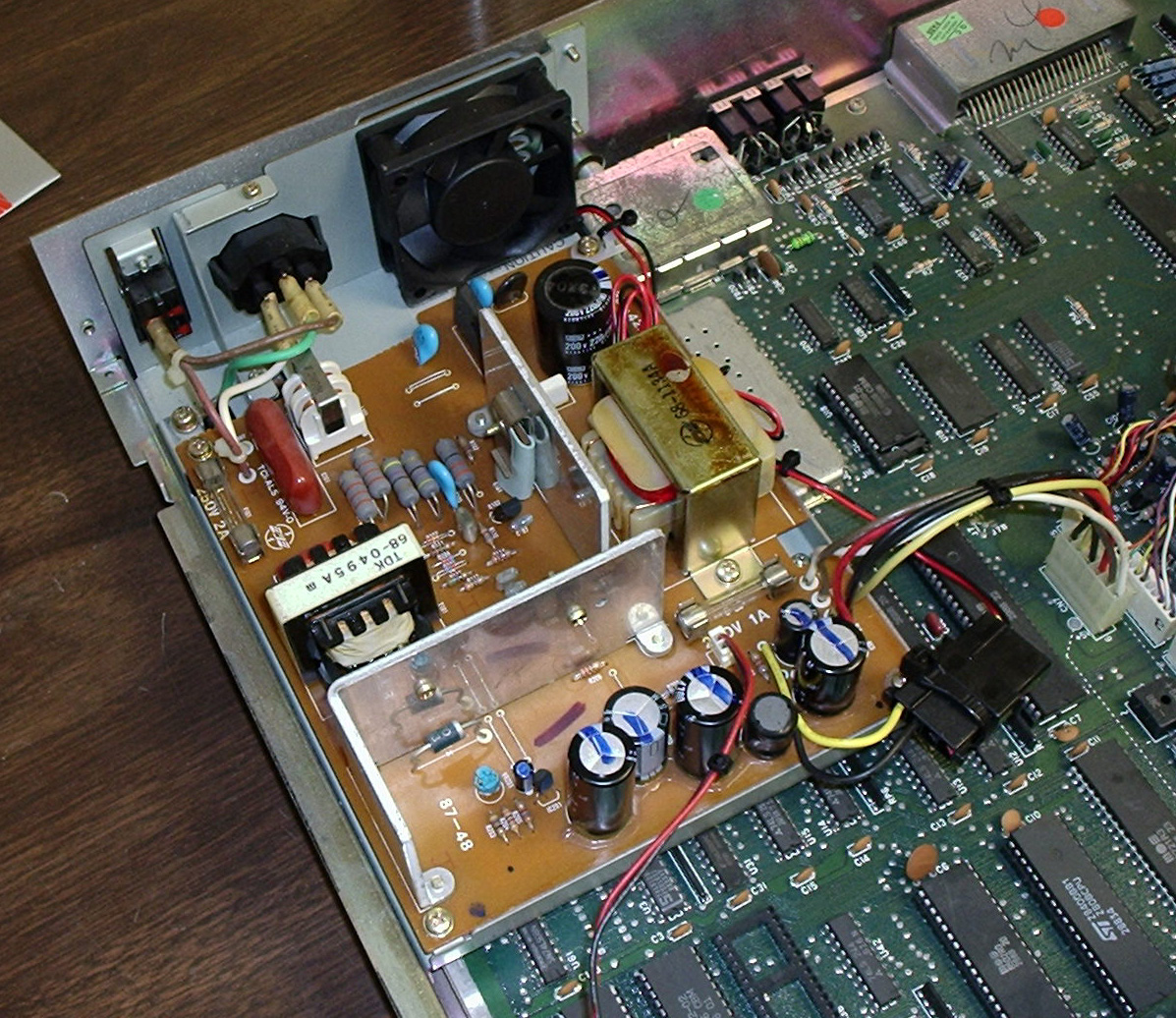
Commodore 128DCR switch-mode power supply, fitted with a 60 mm cooling fan

Late in 1985, Commodore released a new version of the C128 with a redesigned chassis resembling the Amiga 1000. Called the Commodore 128D, this new European model featured a plastic chassis with a carrying handle on the side, incorporated a 1571 disk drive into the main chassis, replaced the built-in keyboard with a detachable one, and added a cooling fan. The keyboard also featured two folding legs for changing the typing angle.

While the Commodore 128D was already released by the end of 1985, the Commodore 128DCR could not have appeared earlier than April 24, 1987, based on the FCC ID BR98YV128DCR filing.

According to Bil Herd, head of the Hardware Team (a.k.a. the "C128 Animals"), the C128D was ready for production at the same time as the regular version. Working to release two models at the same time had increased the risk for on-time delivery and was apparent in that the main PCB has large holes in critical sections to support the C128D case and the normal case concurrently.

In the latter part of 1986, Commodore released a version of the C128D in North America and parts of Europe referred to as the C128DCR, CR meaning "cost-reduced". The DCR model features a stamped-steel chassis in place of the plastic version of the C128D (with no carrying handle), a modular switched-mode power supply similar to that of the C128D, retaining that model's detachable keyboard and internal 1571 floppy drive. A number of components on the mainboard were consolidated to reduce production costs and, as an additional cost-reduction measure, the cooling fan that was fitted to the D model's power supply was removed. However, the mounting provisions on the power supply subchassis were retained, as well as the two 12-volt DC connection points on the power supply's printed circuit board for powering the fan. The C128DCR mounting provision is for a 60 mm fan.

A significant improvement introduced with the DCR model was the replacement of the 8563 video display controller (VDC) with the more technically advanced 8568 VDC and equipping it with 64 KB of video RAM—the maximum amount addressable by the device. The four-fold increase in video RAM over that installed in the "flat" C128 made it possible, among other things, to maintain multiple text screens in support of a true windowing system, or generate higher-resolution graphics with a more flexible color palette. Little commercial software took advantage of these possibilities.

The C128DCR is equipped with new ROMs dubbed the "1986 ROMs", so-named from the copyright date displayed on the power-on banner screen. The new ROMs address a number of bugs that are present in the original ROMs, including an infamous off-by-one error in the keyboard decoding table, in which the Q character would remain lowercase when ⇪ Caps Lock was active. Some software will only run on the DCR, due to dependencies on the computer's enhanced hardware features and revised ROMs.

Despite the DCR's improved RGB video capabilities, Commodore did not enhance BASIC 7.0 with the ability to manipulate RGB graphics. Driving the VDC in graphics mode continues to require the use of calls to screen-editor ROM primitives or their assembly language equivalents, or by using third-party BASIC language extensions, such as Free Spirit Software's "BASIC 8", which adds high-resolution VDC graphics commands to BASIC 7.0.

== Market performance ==
By January 1987, Info reported that "All of those rumors about the imminent death of the C128 may have some basis in fact." Stating that Commodore wanted to divert resources to increasing 64C production and its PC clones, the magazine stated that, "The latest word online is that the last C128 will roll off the lines in December of 1987." Compute! stated in 1989, "If you bought your 128 under the impression that 128-specific software would be plentiful and quick to arrive, you've probably been quite disappointed. One of the 128's major selling points is its total compatibility with the 64, a point that's worked more against the 128 than for it." Because the 128 would run virtually all 64 software, and because the next-generation 32/16-bit home computers—primarily the Commodore Amiga and Atari ST—represented the latest technology, relatively little software for the C128's native mode appeared (probably on the order of 100–200 commercial titles, plus the usual share of public domain and magazine type-in programs), leading some users to regret their purchase. While the C128 sold a total number of 4 million units between 1985 and 1989, its popularity paled in comparison to that of its predecessor.

Some C64 software such as Bard's Tale III and Kid Niki ran in 128 mode without stating this in the documentation, using the autoboot and the 1571's faster disk access. Some Infocom text adventures took advantage of the 80-column screen and increased memory capacity. Some C64 games were ported to native mode like Kikstart 2 and The Last V8 from Mastertronic, which had separate C128 versions, and Ultima V: Warriors of Destiny from Origin Systems, which used extra RAM for music if running on the C128. Star Fleet I: The War Begins from Interstel had separate versions, and took advantage of 80-column display on the C128. However, the vast majority of games were simply run in C64 mode as few developers took advantage of the C128's native performance.

By contrast, many C64 productivity software titles were ported to the C128, including the popular PaperClip and Paperback Writer series. This software used the extra memory, 80-column screen, enhanced keyboard and large-capacity disk drives to provide features that were considered essential for business use. With its advanced BASIC programming language, CP/M compatibility and "user-friendly" native software packages such as Jane, Commodore attempted to create a low-end business market for the C128 similar to its strategy with the Plus/4, even distancing itself from the home computer label by branding the C128 a "Personal Computer" on the case. Significantly, the C128 was the first Commodore computer to advertise its use of Microsoft BASIC, where the Microsoft name would have been a competitive asset.

BASIC 7.0 along with the increased memory capacity, faster storage, and more-standard keyboard made the C128 a better business machine than the C64, but the limitations placed by C64 compatibility prevented it from being a better gaming machine. Game enthusiasts continued to buy the cheaper 64, and people who wanted business machines bought IBM PC clones almost exclusively by the time the C128 was released. The availability of low-cost IBM compatibles like the Leading Edge Model D and Tandy 1000 that, in some cases, sold for less than a complete C128 system derailed Commodore's small business computer strategy. There was a professional-level CAD program, Home Designer by BRiWALL, but again, most of this work was done on PCs by the C128's era. The main reason that the C128 still sold fairly well was probably that it was a much better machine for hobbyist programming than the C64, as well as being a natural follow-on model to owners with significant investments in C64 peripherals and software.

But ultimately the C128 could not compete with the new 16/32-bit systems, which outmatched it and the rest of its 8-bit generation in nearly every aspect. When the C128(D/DCR) was discontinued in 1989, it was reported to cost nearly as much to manufacture as the Amiga 500, even though the C128D had to sell for several hundred dollars less to keep the Amiga's high-end marketing image intact.

Bil Herd has stated that the design goals of the C128 did not initially include 100% compatibility with the C64. Some form of compatibility was always intended after Herd was approached at the Plus/4's introduction by a woman who was disappointed that the educational software package she had written for the C64 would not run on Commodore's new computer, but when Commodore's marketing department learned of this, they independently announced total compatibility. Herd gave the reason for the 128's inclusion of a Z80 processor as ensuring this "100% compatibility" claim, since supporting the C64's Z80 cartridge would have meant the C128 supplying additional power to the cartridge port. He also stated that the VDC video chip and Z80 were sources of trouble during the machine's design. Herd added that "I only expected the C128 to be sold for about a year, we figured a couple of million would be nice and of course it wouldn't undercut Amiga or even the C64". After Commodore raised the price of the 64 for the first time by introducing the redesigned 64C in 1986, its profit from each 64C sold was reportedly much greater than that from the C128.

== Specifications ==
- CPUs:
  - MOS Technology 8502 @ 2 MHz (1 MHz selectable for C64 compatibility mode or C128's 40-column mode)
  - Zilog Z80 @ 4 MHz (running at an effective 2 MHz because of wait states to allow the VIC-II video chip access to the system bus)
  - (C128D(CR)): MOS Technology 6502 for the integrated floppy controller
- MMU: MOS Technology 8722 Memory Management Unit controls 8502/Z80 processor selection; ROM/RAM banking; common RAM areas; relocation of zero page and stack
- RAM: 128 KB system RAM, 2 KB 4-bit dedicated color RAM (for the VIC-II E), 16 KB or 64 KB dedicated video RAM (for the VDC), up to 512 KB REU expansion RAM
- ROM: 72 KB
  - 28 KB BASIC 7.0
  - 4 KB MLM machine code monitor
  - 8 KB C128 KERNAL
  - 4 KB screen editor
  - 4 KB Z80 BIOS
  - 16 KB C64 ROM: ≈9 KB C64 BASIC 2.0 + ≈7 KB C64 KERNAL
  - 4 KB C64 (or international) character generator
  - 4 KB C128 (or national) character generator
  - 32 KB Internal Function ROM (optional: for placement in motherboard socket)
  - 32 KB External Function ROM (optional: for placement in REU socket)
- Video:
  - MOS 8564/8566 VIC-II E (NTSC/PAL) for 40-column composite video (a TV set can be used instead of a monitor if desired)
    - Direct register access through memory-mapped I/O
    - Text mode: 40×25, 16 colors
    - Graphics modes: 160×200, 320×200
    - 8 hardware sprites
    - 2 KB dedicated 4-bit color RAM, otherwise uses main memory as video RAM
  - MOS 8563 VDC (or, in C128DCR, the 8568) for 80-column digital RGBI component video, compatible with IBM PC CGA monitors, monochrome display also possible on composite video monitors; usable with TV sets only when the set has SCART and/or baseband video-in sockets in addition to the antenna connector. Color is possible through SCART, only monochrome through baseband video-in.
    - Indirect register access (address register, data register in mapped memory)
    - Text mode: Fully programmable, typically 80×25 or 80x50, 16 RGBI colors (not the same palette as the VIC-II)
    - Graphics modes: Fully programmable, typical modes are 320x200, 640×200, and 640×400 (interlaced).
    - 16 KB dedicated video RAM (64 KB standard in C128DCR, C128/C128D can be upgraded to 64 KB), accessible to the CPU only in a doubly indirect method (address register, data register on VDC, which in turn are addressed through address register, data register in mapped memory)
    - Limited blitter functionality
- Sound:
  - MOS 6581 SID (or, in the C128DCR, the MOS 8580 SID) synthesizer chip
    - 3 voices, ADSR-controllable
    - Standard SID waveforms (triangle, sawtooth, variable pulse, noise, and certain combined modes)
    - Multi-mode filter
    - 3 ring modulators
- I/O ports:
  - All Commodore 64 ports with 100 percent compatibility, plus the following:
  - Higher "burst mode" speed possible on the serial bus
  - Expansion port more flexibly programmable
  - RGBI video output (DE9-connector) logically similar to the IBM PC CGA connector, but with an added monochrome composite signal. This added signal causes a minor incompatibility with certain CGA monitors that can be rectified by removing pin 7 from the plug at one end of the connecting cable.
  - External keyboard input (DB25-connector) (C128D(CR) only)

== See also ==
- Commodore BASIC – BASIC programming language dialect
- Commodore 64 peripherals
- Keyboard computer

== Bibliography ==
- Greenley, Larry, et al. (1986). Commodore 128 Programmer's Reference Guide. Bantam Computer Books/Commodore Publications. ISBN 0-553-34378-5.
- Gerits, K.; Schieb, J.; Thrun, F. (1986). Commodore 128 Internals. 2nd ed. Grand Rapids, Michigan: Abacus Software, Inc. ISBN 0-916439-42-9. Original German edition (1985), Düsseldorf, West Germany: Data Becker GmbH & Co. KG.
- Simmonds, Thomas Jr.; Borden, Jim (September 1986). "Instant Data Statements". Run. No. 33. pp. 82–84.
