= Shiraz Shivji =

Computer game programmer (born 1947)

- Born: 1947 (age 78–79); Tanganyika Territory
- Education: University of Southampton; Stanford University
- Known for: Atari ST (architect); Commodore 64 (engineer)

Shiraz Shivji (born 1947 in what is now known as Tanzania) was the primary designer of the Atari ST computer for Atari Corporation, which was developed in five months and released in 1985, and one of the engineers who developed the Commodore 64.

== Biography ==
Shiraz Shivji, born 1947 in what is now Tanzania, was of Indian Ismaili heritage.

=== Commodore ===
Shivji began work at Silicon Valley, and found work at Commodore International, where he was one of the engineers that helped build the Commodore 64. By 1984, he had been promoted to being the director of engineering at Commodore.

In 1984, Shivji was involved in a scandal related to his work on the Commodore 900. He was one of three systems engineers on the project since its inception in 1983. He was sued by Commodore in mid-July 1984 for disclosing confidential research information connected to this project and disk drive design plans as he was beginning to transfer to Atari Corporation with Jack Tramiel. He was acquitted of all charges in court alongside several other engineers.

=== Atari Corporation ===
When Jack Tramiel took over Atari in 1984, with a number of Commodore engineers, the company was in bad shape, and Shivji's proposed cheap, powerful home computer, codenamed 'Rock Bottom Price,' was seen as a solution to financial woes. While working for the newly founded Atari Corporation, Shivji was the primary designer of the Atari ST computer, among other projects.

Shivji became Atari's Vice President of Research and Development, and led a team of six engineers who designed the Atari 520ST computer. This work was completed in five months (July to December 1984).

Shivji later led the design of the Atari TT before leaving Atari in 1990.

=== Post-Atari ===
Kamran Elahian recruited Shivji for his 1989 startup company, Momenta. While there, Shivji designed the Momenta Pen Computer, an early pentop computer, and one of the first full sized tablet computers.

Shivji received seven patents between the years of 2000 and 2007.
