= MOS Technology 8563 =

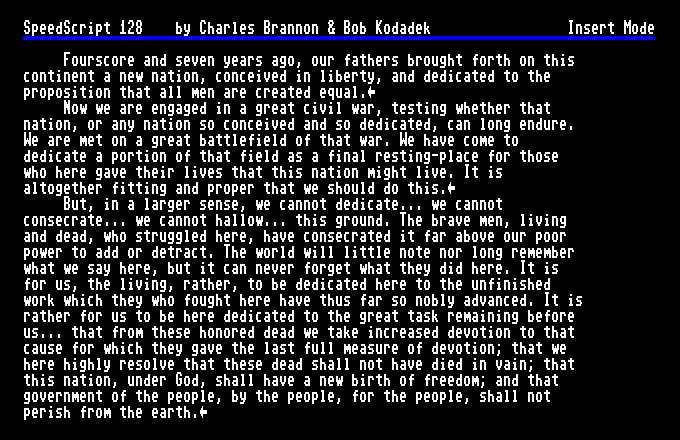
The VDC was designed with office suite applications in mind. Shown here is SpeedScript 128, a word processor.

The 8563 Video Display Controller (VDC) was an integrated circuit produced by MOS Technology. It was used in the Commodore 128 (C128) computer to generate an 80-column (640 × 200 pixel) RGB video display, running alongside a VIC-II which supported Commodore 64-compatible graphics. The DCR models (as well as a few D-models) of the C128 used the later and more technically advanced 8568 [D]VDC controller.

== History and characteristics ==
Originally intended for the Commodore 900, a planned (but unreleased) UNIX-based business computer based around the Zilog Z8000, Commodore designed the VDC into several prototype machines. Of these, only the Commodore 128 ever saw production. Unlike earlier MOS video chips such as the popular VIC-II, the VDC had dedicated video memory, 16 kilobytes (16,384 bytes; upgradable to 64 kilobytes, 65,536 bytes) in the original or "flat" C128 and 64 kilobytes in the C128DCR. This RAM was not directly accessible by the microprocessor.

The 8563 was more difficult to produce than most of the rest of the MOS Technology line, and initial yields were very low. The early units also had significant reliability problems and tended to self-destruct from overheating. Also, there were timing issues with the VDC that would cause indirect load and store operations on its registers to malfunction.

Officially, the VDC was a text-only chip, although a careful reading of the technical literature by MOS Technology that was given to the early C128 developers did indicate that a high-resolution bitmap mode was possible—it simply wasn't described in any detail. BASIC 7.0, the C128's built-in programming language, only supported high-resolution graphics in 40-column mode via the legacy VIC-II chip.

This Ultra Hi-Res demo showcases the VDC's blitter capabilities with a simple 3D animation of a wire frame model of a cube.

Shortly after the release of the C128 the VDC's bitmap mode was described in considerable detail in the Data Becker book "Commodore 128 - Das große GRAFIK-Buch" (published in late 1985 in the United States by Abacus Software), and an assembly language program was provided by the German authors Klaus Löffelmann and Dieter Vüllers, in which it was possible to set or clear any pixel or, using BASIC to perform the necessary calculations, generate bitmapped geometric shapes on the 80 column screen. In February 1986, less than a year after the Commodore 128's release, RUN magazine published "Ultra Hi-Res Graphics", an article describing the VDC's bitmapped mode and including a type-in program (written in 8502 assembly language) that extended BASIC 7.0's capabilities to support 640×200 high-resolution graphics using the 8563. Authors Lou Wallace and David Darus later developed the Ultra Hi-Res utility into a commercial package, BASIC 8. One of the most popular third-party utilities for the C128, this offered more advanced VDC high-resolution capabilities to a wide audience of programmers.

Commodore finally offered complete official documentation on the VDC in the Commodore 128 Programmer's Reference Guide. VDC bitmap modes were used extensively in the C128 version of the GEOS operating system.

The VDC lacked sprite capabilities, which limited its use in gaming applications. However, it did contain blitting capabilities to autonomously perform small block memory copies within its dedicated video RAM. While the VDC is performing such a copy, the system CPU can continue running code, provided no other VDC accesses are attempted before the copy is finished. These functions were used by the C128's screen editor ROM to rapidly scroll or clear screen sections.

== Technical specifications ==
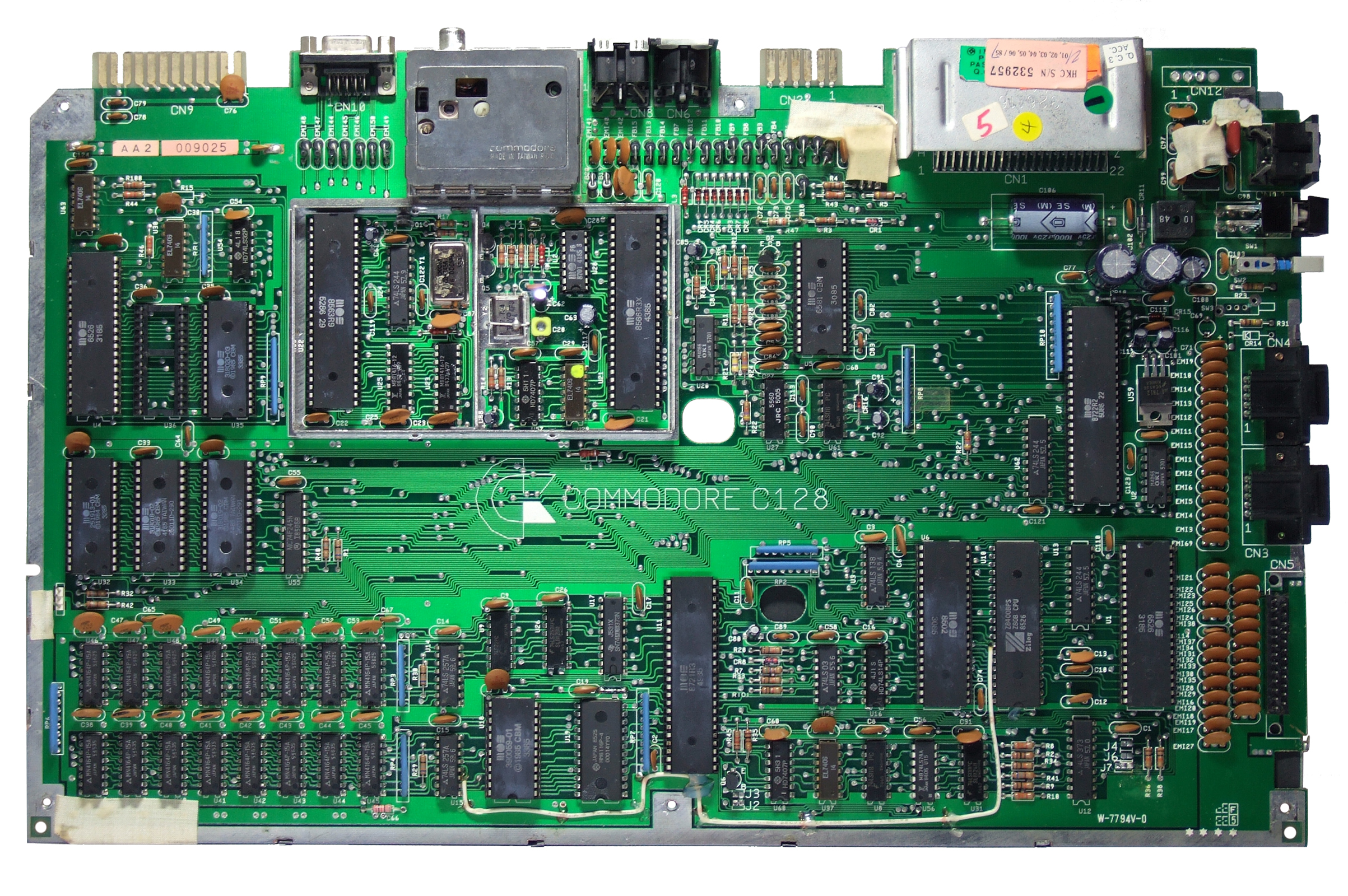
The 8563 VDC and related ICs on the C128 motherboard.
- RGBI output (RGB plus Intensity) compatible with IBM's CGA video standard.*
- 16 or 64 kilobyte address space for display, character shape and display attribute memory (dedicated, separate from system memory).
- Up to 720 × 700 pixel video resolution in interlaced mode (maximum with 64 kilobyte video RAM). Other image sizes are possible, depending on programmer's needs, such as 640 × 200 non-interlaced, 640 × 400 interlaced, etc.
- 80 × 25 characters text resolution (C128 kernal default); other sizes such as 80 × 50 or 40 × 25 are possible.
- 8 colors at 2 intensities.

* This applies to US 60 Hz C128s only. 50 Hz C128 machines output a signal with a 50 Hz vertical refresh. Although not conforming to the CGA standard, most CGA monitors were capable of displaying the 50 Hz signal without problems. However, some monitors either failed to resolve the signal or succeeded in resolving it, but sooner or later their deflection circuits would fail due to electrical or thermal stress, requiring repair.

== Programming ==
Addressing the VDC's internal registers and dedicated video memory must be accomplished by indirect means. First the program must tell the VDC which of its 37 internal registers is to be accessed. Next the program must wait until the VDC is ready for the access, after which a read or write on the selected internal register may be performed. The following assembly code is typical of a register read:

         ldx #regnum       ;VDC register to access
         stx $d600         ;write to control register
 loop    bit $d600         ;check bit 7 of status register
         bpl loop          ;VDC not ready
         lda $d601         ;read from VDC register
         ...

The following code is typical of a register write operation:

         ldx #regnum       ;VDC register to write to
         stx $d600         ;write to control register
 loop    bit $d600         ;check bit 7 of status register
         bpl loop          ;VDC not ready
         sta $d601         ;write to VDC register
         ...

The same is feasible in BASIC language, calling specific KERNAL routines :

This code is typical of a VDC register read, where ⟨register⟩ it's a number between 0 and 36, as show below.

BANK15
...
SYS DEC("CDDA"),, register : RREG VDC
REM $ccda aka 52698 in decimal
PRINT VDC
         ...

this code is typical of a VDC register write, where ⟨register⟩ it's a number between 0 and 36, and ⟨value⟩ it's a number between 0 and 255, that you wish to place in that register.

BANK15
...
SYS DEC("CDCC"), value, register
REM $ccdc aka 52684 in decimal
         ...

Owing to this somewhat cumbersome method of controlling the VDC, the maximum possible frame rate in bitmapped mode is generally too slow for arcade-style action video games, in which bit-intensive manipulation of the display is required.

In standard text mode, the VDC behaves much like the VIC-II except with 2k of screen memory instead of 1k. The power on default configuration places screen memory in $0-$7FF and the color memory at $800-$9FF and they can be moved anywhere in VDC memory as long as it's on a 2k boundary. Attributes are handled like the VIC-II's high resolution mode with a global background color and each character foreground color set individually per the color RAM. In addition to color data, the latter also contains attribute data for each character. Bit 4 causes the character to blink if enabled, Bit 5 produces underlined characters, and Bit 6 inverts the character's bitmap pattern. Bit 7 enables the alternate character set. The VDC can use as many as 512 characters. When the alternate character flag for a given character is enabled, the character pattern will be drawn from characters 256–511. Thus if character 65 is displayed, enabling the alternate character flag will display character 321 instead. The alternate character flag is normally used when upper/lowercase mode is set—the flag is enabled for all VDC screen positions, causing the upper/lowercase character set and its reverse video versions to be displayed instead of the default uppercase/graphics character set.

The VDC does not use a character ROM, instead the VIC-II's character ROM patterns are simply copied into VDC RAM as part of the C128's power on initialization including the patterns for reverse video characters even though the VDC is capable of inverting characters in hardware. Character patterns take 16 bytes instead of 8 to store as the VDC has adjustable character height. Since the screen is 25 lines, in practice character height is limited to 8 lines meaning that half the space for character data is left unused and wasted. The power on default configuration places the character data in $2000-$3FFF. $2000-$23FF contain the patterns for the uppercase/graphics characters, $2C00-$33FF the upper/lowercase characters, while $2400-$2BFF and $3400-$3FFF contain the reverse video patterns for each set. The user may freely define any custom characters and map them into VDC memory.

== Register listing ==
This information was adapted from the Commodore 128 Programmer's Reference Guide

Register	Hexadecimal	Bit 7	Bit 6	Bit 5	Bit 4	Bit 3	Bit 2	Bit 1	Bit 0	Description
0	$00	HT7	HT6	HT5	HT4	HT3	HT2	HT1	HT0	Horizontal Total
1	$01	HD7	HD6	HD5	HD4	HD3	HD2	HD1	HD0	Horizontal Displayed
2	$02	HP7	HP6	HP5	HP4	HP3	HP2	HP1	HP0	Horizontal Sync Position
3	$03	VW3	VW2	VW1	VW0	HW3	HW2	HW1	HW0	Vertical/Horizontal Sync Width
4	$04	VT7	VT6	VT5	VT4	VT3	VT2	VT1	VT0	Vertical Total
5	$05	—	—	—	VA4	VA3	VA2	VA1	VA0	Vertical Adjust
6	$06	VD7	VD6	VD5	VD4	VD3	VD2	VD1	VD0	Vertical Displayed
7	$07	VP7	VP6	VP5	VP4	VP3	VP2	VP1	VP0	Vertical Sync Position
8	$08	—	—	—	—	—	—	IM1	IM0	Interlace Mode
9	$09	—	—	—	—	CTV4	CTV3	CTV2	CTV1	Character Total Vertical
10	$0A	—	CM1	CM0	CS4	CS3	CS2	CS1	CS0	Cursor Mode, Start Scan
11	$0B	—	—	—	CE4	CE3	CE2	CE1	CE0	Cursor End Scan Line
12	$0C	DS15	DS14	DS13	DS12	DS11	DS10	DS9	DS8	Display Start Address High Byte
13	$0D	DS7	DS6	DS5	DS4	DS3	DS2	DS1	DS0	Display Start Address Low Byte
14	$0E	CP15	CP14	CP13	CP12	CP11	CP10	CP9	CP8	Cursor Position High Byte
15	$0F	CP7	CP6	CP5	CP4	CP3	CP2	CP1	CP0	Cursor Position Low Byte
16	$10	LPV7	LPV6	LPV5	LPV4	LPV3	LPV2	LPV1	LPV0	Light Pen Vertical Position
17	$11	LPH7	LPH6	LPH5	LPH4	LPH3	LPH2	LPH1	LPH0	Light Pen Horizontal Position
18	$12	UA15	UA14	UA13	UA12	UA11	UA10	UA9	UA8	Update Address High Byte
19	$13	UA7	UA6	UA5	UA4	UA3	UA2	UA1	UA0	Update Address Low Byte
20	$14	AA15	AA14	AA13	AA12	AA11	AA10	AA9	AA8	Attribute Start Address High Byte
21	$15	AA7	AA6	AA5	AA4	AA3	AA2	AA1	AA0	Attribute Start Address Low Byte
22	$16	CTH3	CTH2	CTH1	CTH0	CDH3	CDH2	CDH1	CDH0	Character Total Horizontal, Character Display Horizontal
23	$17	—	—	—	CDV4	CDV3	CDV2	CDV1	CDV0	Character Display Vertical
24	$18	COPY	RVS	CBRATE	VSS4	VSS3	VSS2	VSS1	VSS0	Vertical Smooth Scrolling
25	$19	TEXT	ATR	SEMI	DBL	HSS3	HSS2	HSS1	HSS0	Horizontal Smooth Scrolling
26	$1A	FG3	FG2	FG1	FG0	BG3	BG2	BG1	BG0	Foreground/Background color
27	$1B	AI7	AI6	AI5	AI4	AI3	AI2	AI1	AI0	Address Increment per Row
28	$1C	CB15	CB14	CB13	RAM	—	—	—	—	Character Base Address
29	$1D	—	—	—	UL4	UL3	UL2	UL1	UL0	Underline Scan Line
30	$1E	WC7	WC6	WC5	WC4	WC3	WC2	WC1	WC0	Word Count
31	$1F	DA7	DA6	DA5	DA4	DA3	DA2	DA1	DA0	Data Register
32	$20	BA15	BA14	BA13	BA12	BA11	BA10	BA9	BA8	Block Start Address High Byte
33	$21	BA7	BA6	BA5	BA4	BA3	BA2	BA1	BA0	Block Start Address Low Byte
34	$22	DEB7	DEB6	DEB5	DEB4	DEB3	DEB2	DEB1	DEB0	Display Enable Begin
35	$23	DEE7	DEE6	DEE5	DEE4	DEE3	DEE2	DEE1	DEE0	Display Enable End
36	$24	—	—	—	—	DRR3	DRR2	DRR1	DRR0	DRAM Refresh Rate
