= Commodore LCD =

Home computer

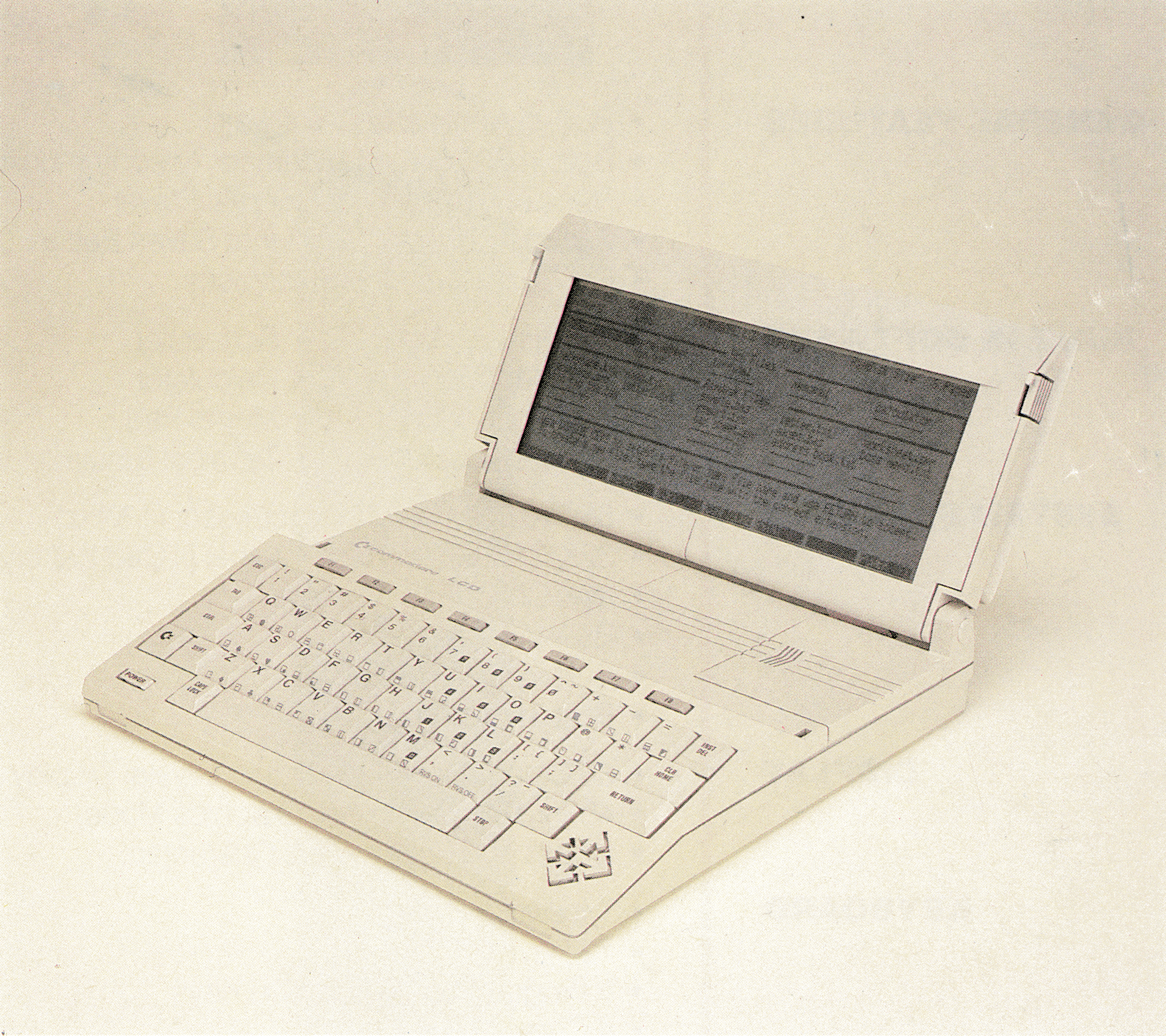
- Also known as: CLCD
- Developer: Commodore International
- Type: laptop
- Released: Shown January 1985, never released.
- Operating system: Commodore BASIC 3.6
- CPU: Rockwell 65C102 @ 1 MHz
- Memory: 32 KB RAM
- Storage: 96 KB ROM
- Display: LCD (80 x 16 char, 480 x 128 pixels)
- Connectivity: Modem (300 baud)

The Commodore LCD (sometimes known in short as the CLCD) is an unreleased LCD-equipped laptop made by Commodore International. It was presented at the January 1985 Consumer Electronics Show, but never released. The CLCD was not directly compatible with other Commodore home computers, but its built-in Commodore BASIC 3.6 interpreter could run programs written in the Commodore 128's BASIC 7.0, as long as these programs did not include system-specific POKE commands. Like the Commodore 264 and Radio Shack TRS-80 Model 100 series computers, the CLCD had several built-in ROM-based office application programs.

The CLCD featured a 1 MHz Rockwell 65C102 CPU (a CMOS 6502 variant) and 32 KB of RAM (expandable to 64 KB internally). The BASIC interpreter and application programs were built into 96 KB of ROM.
