= BASIC 8 =

BASIC 8 (or BASIC 8.0) – "The Enhanced Graphics System For The C128" – was an American-designed graphics system developed by Walrusoft of Gainesville, Florida and published in 1986 by Patech Software of Somerset, New Jersey. The system was an extension of Commodore's BASIC 7.0 for the Commodore 128 computer. BASIC 8.0 provided commands lacking in BASIC 7.0 to generate (color) graphics in the C128's high-resolution 80-column mode (640 × 200 pixels) for RGB monitors.

== Background ==
=== The problem ===
Unlike its competitors, such as the Apple II and Atari 8-bit computers, Commodore’s BASIC 2.0 programming language built into the Commodore 64 (C-64) lacks commands for generating sound and high-resolution, bit-mapped graphics, and responding to joysticks and game paddles. Instead, awkward and slow BASIC PEEK and POKE sequences, or custom-written assembly language routines, are required to accomplish these tasks. The lack of suitable BASIC commands led to the development of many third-party language extensions, such as Simons' BASIC, greatly reducing the complication of writing games in BASIC.

Upon its introduction in 1985, the Commodore 128 (C-128) had BASIC 7.0—a substantially more-powerful version of BASIC 2.0—that includes commands for sound and graphics generation, as well as joystick and paddle detection. In addition to its more-powerful BASIC, the C-128 is equipped with dual video displays: an 8563 video display controller (VDC) for generating an 80-column text display, and an enhanced VIC-II video interface controller for generating a 40-column text display like that of the C-64.

When operated in its high-resolution, bit-mapped display mode, the VDC is capable of 640 × 200 pixel resolution, twice that of the VIC-II’s 320 × 200 pixel resolution. However, the BASIC 7.0 commands that manipulate bit-mapped graphics are only effective on the VIC-II display. If a programmer wishes to generate bit-mapped graphics on the VDC display, s/he must resort to assembly language (there are intractable difficulties in PEEKing and POKEing VDC registers) and deal with the convoluted means by which the VDC is controlled.

=== A solution ===
BASIC 8.0, available via floppy disk or ROM, provided many graphics commands that were competitive with the C128's competitors in the high-end 8-bit microcomputer market. BASIC 8.0 was fully compatible with the various first-party RAM and video RAM expansion chips and cartridges, as well as mice and joysticks. It also provided basic 3D graphics commands. Along with a 188-page manual, the software package included an example of a GUI, and a high-res paint program, Basic Paint, both developed using BASIC 8.0.

== History ==
RUN magazine published in February 1986 "Ultra Hi-Res Graphics", an article describing the VDC's bitmapped mode and including a type-in program (written in 8502 assembly language) that extended BASIC 7.0's capabilities to support 640 × 200 high-resolution graphics using the 8563. Authors Lou Wallace and David Darus later developed the Ultra Hi-Res utility into a commercial package, what would become BASIC 8.0.

The BASIC 8 package was developed by Walrusoft's Louis Wallace and David Darus, with contributions from Ken French (printer drivers) and indirectly from Richard Rylander (who allowed his 3D solids commands for the Commodore 64, originally published in Dr. Dobb's Journal, to be converted to the C128's hi-res mode).

== Source code and copy protection ==
Source code of some of the BASIC 8 package was provided, and the BASIC 8.0 disk lacked any sort of copy protection, but this was before the Open Source Initiative; it was done as a courtesy. Instead of threatening legal action, Walrusoft simply asked users not to copy the software in the documentation. It worked; BASIC 8.0 became one of the best selling expansions for the C128.

== Sample commands ==
In BASIC 8.0, all added commands were prefaced with the @ mark, which was not normally used in Commodore BASIC, to distinguish between the original and the new keywords. The use of this character would allow the developer to extend BASIC 7.0 without having to re-tokenize the commands as it was done on the C64. It was accomplished by trapping the syntax error generated by the command.

- @CHAR – Displays a text string on a bitmap field (similar to the BASIC 7.0's low-res CHAR command)
- @MODE – Switch between one of up to 32 high-res screens
- @PAINT – Fill a closed area with a color or a pattern
- @PIXEL – Returns the color value of a pixel
- @STASH – Copies part or all of a screen for later usage
- @WALRUS – Displays the Walrusoft logo and the type/size of video RAM used (16 or 64 KB)
- @WINDOWOPEN – Define part of the screen as a 'window' for purposes of drawing

== References notes and citations ==
=== References ===
- Wallace, Louis R. (1987). Basic 8 Manual. Somerset, NJ: Walrusoft/Patech Software, Inc. p. 188 pp.

=== Notes ===
1. The VDC was programmed by writing commands to and reading status messages from a single control register and transferring data between system RAM and the chip's dedicated video RAM (16 or 64 KB, depending on C128 version) via a single data register, following a relatively complex protocol – a laborious and slow procedure compared with the straightforward use of the several discrete, memory-mapped control/status registers the shared system/video memory setup of the VIC-II. Many programmers took advantage of a VDC control primitive buried deep within the part of the KERNAL that controlled the 80-column video display, rather than writing their own primitive.
