= BASIC extension =

BASIC toolkits (aka BASIC extensions) were a common type of program for 1980s 8-bit home computers. Generally third-party extensions, they added additional features to a computer's built-in BASIC interpreter.

== Technical concept ==
Toolkits ran as extensions to the BASIC interpreter supplied with the machine. At the time, such interpreters almost always came programmed into the ROM of the computer, making it impossible to modify or patch the code. It was also extremely rare for manufacturers to offer upgrades or bugfixes except as part of new models of machine.

As the original language was held in immutable ROM, it generally was difficult for a toolkit to directly extend the language, except by adding new keywords to perform functions not implemented by the original interpreter.

== Functionality ==
Typical toolkit functionality included editing extensions, such as commands to renumber a program, perform block line deletions, and so on, facilities to make structured programming possible, and additional keywords to perform new functions. In the case of the latter, these new functions often allowed the programmer to easily access the computer's graphics, sound and other hardware which was often partially or completely unsupported in the early BASICs. This would have otherwise been achieved by arcane usage of PEEK and POKE commands and machine language routines.

== Examples ==
- Beta BASIC (ZX Spectrum) – Extension to Sinclair BASIC; started out as a simple toolkit but grew into a full interpreter
- Lightning BASIC (Amstrad PCW) – Extension to Mallard BASIC with many new facilities (see the Mallard BASIC article for details)
- Simons' BASIC (Commodore 64) – Extension to BASIC 2.0 with 114 extra commands; programmed by a 16-year-old boy and marketed by CBM
- Super Expander (VIC-20) – A combined RAM-expansion (3 kibibytes) and BASIC extension cartridge

== See also ==
- List of BASIC dialects#BASIC extensions
- List of computers with on-board BASIC
