= Super Expander 64 =

Extension for the Commodore 64 BASIC interpreter

Super Expander 64 is a cartridge-based extension to the built in BASIC interpreter of Commodore 64 home computer. It was published by Commodore Business Machines in 1983. The built-in BASIC of the C64, Commodore BASIC, was adapted from the PET and VIC-20, and the language does not have direct support for the system's sound and graphics hardware. Access to the hardware had to be done though directly accessing the memory locations mapped to the specific hardware registers using PEEK and POKE statements. Super Expander 64 adds functions for drawing graphics, using sprites, reading joysticks, playing audio, and other features.

The extra code is mapped into the "lower cartridge" 8 kilobytes area at $8000-$9FFF, reducing the 38,911 bytes for user programs by said 8K.

== Graphics ==
After initializing the screen for "high-resolution" (320 × 200 monochrome pixels) or multicolor (160 wide × 200 pixels in four colors) graphics with the GRAPHIC command, one could draw lines, circles, ellipses, arcs, boxes and more using the DRAW, CIRCLE, and BOX commands. PAINT would "flood-fill" an area enclosed by lines, e.g. the interior of a CIRCLE or BOX. A CHAR command was used to "print" characters from the character generator ROM onto the bitmap graphics screen. SSHAPE and GSHAPE would store the contents of a rectangular area of the high-res graphics into a string variable, and GSHAPE would "stamp" it back onto the screen at arbitrary locations. Such "graphics-in-a-string" could also be used to transfer something drawn on the hi-res screen into one of the eight sprite patterns.

=== Sprites ===
Besides a range of commands to initialize, position and move sprites (or Movable Object Blocks as Commodore called them; hardware-supported graphic elements that could move freely on the screen independently of other graphics and text on the screen), Super Expander had a built in tool to edit the pattern of 8 sprites (called upon with the SPRDEF command), either in high-res (24 × 21 pixels) or multicolor (12 wide × 21 pixels) mode.

There was even a way of implementing "interrupts" in the BASIC program if two sprites collided, if a sprite collided with other graphics and/or text on the screen, or if an attached light pen was activated. A COLINT command set up the interrupt, pointing to the beginning BASIC line number of the "interrupt handler", which had to end in a RETURN statement (part of standard, unexpanded BASIC) in order to transfer control back to the interrupted, "mainline" part of the program.

== Sound ==
Playing a sequence of musical notes was hooked onto the standard BASIC PRINT command by the use of a special "control character", much like the cursor control, color changes and other control characters. E.g. PRINT CHR$(6);"CDEFGAB" played a rising scale. Commands like TEMPO and TUNE was used to set the playback tempo and the timbre of the note sequence.

A "quirk" of this feature is that by typing the special control character (by pressing CTRL+F) along with a quote mark, then deleting the quote mark, the machine would "play" whatever was typed while editing the program; hit the G key, and the machine played a "Pling!" with the pitch of a G note...!

== Hardware I/O ==
Functions like RJOY, RPEN and RPOT would read the state of a connected joystick, light pen, or analog paddle. In combination with the sprite-motion-related commands, it only took a single line of BASIC code to make a sprite move in the direction indicated by a connected joystick.

== Miscellaneous ==
A KEY command was available, which would set up the four function keys on the 64's keyboard to "enter" an arbitrary string. By default, these keys were set up to type commands like RUN, LIST, SPRDEF, GRAPHICS and others, but the user could change this using the KEY command in either direct mode or under program control.

== Technical issues ==
All the versions of BASIC on Commodore's 8-bit machines used a scheme of replacing BASIC keywords with single-byte code -- e.g. the word "PRINT" would be substituted by a single byte value, or token, rather than the five ASCII-codes for the five letters in the word. Super Expander added more commands than this system could accommodate, so a system of two-byte tokens for the new commands was implemented.

Because of a quirk in the BASIC interpreter (the handling of the "THEN-part" of an IF/THEN construct didn't jump through a vector in RAM but instead took a direct JuMP to the standard, unexpanded BASIC command decoding routine), IF/THEN statements needed to have an extra colon (:) inserted right after the THEN keyword, if the following command was one of Super Expander's non-standard BASIC keywords. For instance, IF (condition) THEN DRAW ... would yield a ?SYNTAX ERROR message — one had to write it like IF (condition) THEN:DRAW ... — note the colon between THEN and the Super Expander-added command DRAW.

The manual is available online as an etext.
