= TRON command =

Debugging command in BASIC

TRON is a debugging command in old dialects of the BASIC programming language. It is an abbreviation of TRace ON. It was used primarily for debugging line-numbered BASIC GOTO and GOSUB statements. In text-mode environments such as the TRS-80 or DOS, it would print the current line number which was being executed, on-screen. In a windowed environment, when the TRON command had been executed, a window would indicate the line number being executed at that instant. This command's opposite is TROFF, or TRace OFF, used to turn off command tracing.

TRON and TROFF were included in Altair Extended BASIC (written by Microsoft) in 1975, and were inherited by many of the microcomputer and PC BASICs that descended from it.

TRON and TROFF were made obsolete by the advent of multitasking windowing environments, which permit a developer to switch back and forth between program output and source code. Modern IDEs take advantage of this to allow far more sophisticated debugging (line-by-line step-through execution of source code, examination/modification of variables, etc.). As a result, TRON/TROFF are no longer supported by most current BASIC dialects, including Microsoft Visual Basic.
