= Direct mode =

In computing, immediate execution of commands

In computing, direct or immediate mode in an interactive programming system is the immediate execution of commands, statements, or expressions. In many interactive systems, most of these can both be included in programs or executed directly in a read–eval–print loop (REPL).

Most interactive systems also offer the possibility of defining programs in the REPL, either with explicit declarations, such as Python's def, or by labelling them with line numbers. Programs can then be run by calling a named or numbered procedure or by running a main program.

Many programming systems, from Lisp and JOSS to Python and Perl have interactive REPLs which also allow defining programs. Most integrated development environments offer a direct mode where, during debugging and while the program execution is suspended, commands can be executed directly in the current scope and the result is displayed.

== Example ==
Non-direct mode in Basic

 10 PRINT "HELLO WIKIPEDIA"
 READY.
 RUN
 HELLO WIKIPEDIA
 READY.

Direct mode in Basic

 PRINT "HELLO WIKIPEDIA"
 HELLO WIKIPEDIA
 READY.
