= Run (magazine) =

Defunct American computer magazine

- Editor: Dennis Brisson
- Staff writers: Tim Walsh; Lou Wallace; Ellen Rule; Beth Jala; Tony Branter; Robert Rockefeller; Arnie Katz; John Ryan; Walt Latocha
- Frequency: Bi-monthly
- First issue: January 1984
- Final issue Number: November/December 1992; Issue #94, volume 9 number 6
- Company: IDG Communications
- Country: United States
- Language: English
- ISSN: 0741-4285

Run (stylized as RUN) was an American computer magazine published monthly by IDG Communications with its first issue debuting in January 1984. Bi-monthly publishing began in June/July 1990 (issue #78, volume 7 number 6), and went on until the magazine folded in November/December 1992 (issue #94, volume 9 number 6). In its heyday, Run's monthly circulation was in the 200,000–300,000 range. Folio, the trade journal of the magazine industry, rated it as the second fastest-growing U.S. magazine of 1985.

The magazine contained articles about Commodore 8-bit home computers and peripherals, as well as reviews on available software packages for the computers. In addition, every issue featured several type-in programs written in BASIC and/or machine language. The magazine's name came from the BASIC command "RUN", which started execution of the computer's program, presumably typed in from the magazine.

The front cover was originally accented by a logotype reading "RUN", with each letter placed on a key button resembling those used on the C-64. In July 1987 the keys were removed and the font became italicized with rounded letters.

== Content ==
Run columns included the following:

- Magic, perhaps the magazine's most distinctive feature, was a collection of short programs, programming tips, and tricks, mostly submitted by readers. Several dozen were published each month, and they were all numbered in hexadecimal, with each issue's numbering taking over where the last one had left off. Readers could write to Magic at P.O. Box 101011, a box number chosen for its binary appearance. Often, a "special issue" published at the end of the year would collect the year's Magic entries and augment them with many unpublished ones. This column, created and compiled by Louis F. Sander, debuted in the first issue and was run during the entire life of the magazine.
- Mega-Magic was a monthly column that included type-in programming utilities larger and more powerful than those in the standard Magic columns.
- Commodore Clinic, a letters column, allowed users to write in with questions about hardware and software issues, which would then be answered in the magazine.
- Run Amok was an errata column that published corrections to previous type-in programs and articles.
- Software Gallery reviewed various commercial software packages.
- 128 Mode, taken over from Commodore's own magazine when it was purchased by Run, included programming advice and short type-ins for the Commodore 128.
- Gold Mine was another Louis F. Sander column taken over from Commodore's magazine. It featured tips and tricks for commercial games.

== Contributors ==
Michael Vaughn Konshak, better known as Mike Konshak, a BASIC software developer and mechanical engineer, contributed the popular DataFile database management program and many other utilities for the Commodore 64 to Run. The code was first published in the back of the November 1984 issue. A small note, written by Konshak at the end of the article, stated: "If you don't want to type this in, send me $6.00 and I'll send you a disk". 1500 Run subscribers sent Konshak money in the first month, which prompted the editors to create the "Re-Run" disk to generate more revenue for the publisher.

A series of dozen follow-on article by Konshak were published in the ensuing two years, and the programs were exclusively sold on Run's Re-Run disk, as the editors restricted authors from soliciting for disks in the magazine from then on. Datafile then evolved into dFile64, dFile128, dFcalc, DFword, etc., and was sold by Konshak through his small company, MichaelSoft – "[a] cottage industry of homespun software".
