= PEEK and POKE =

Commands in some high-level programming languages

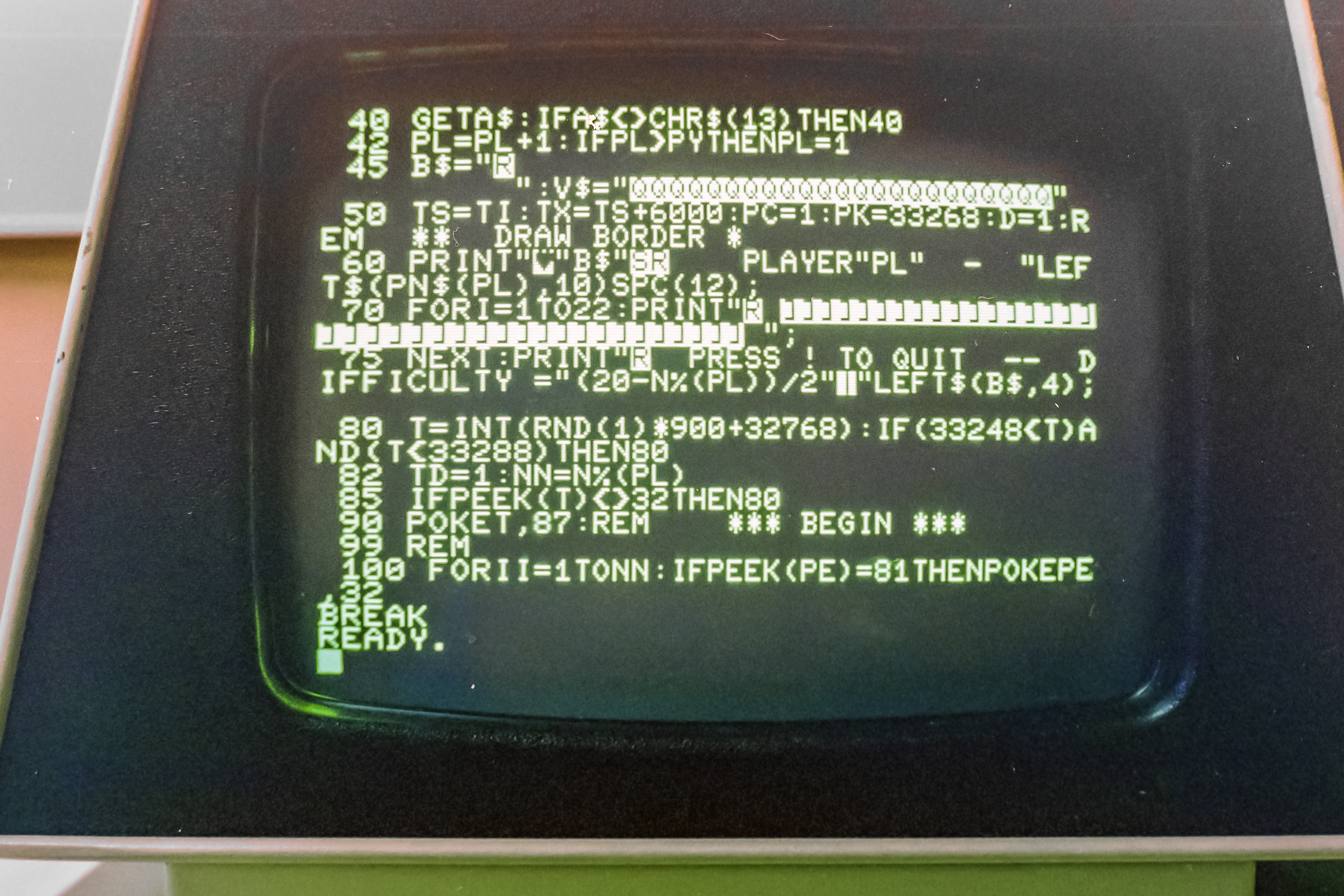
PEEK and POKE in line 100 of a Commodore Basic program on a CBM 3016

In computing, PEEK and POKE are commands used in some high-level programming languages for accessing the contents of a specific memory cell referenced by its memory address. PEEK gets the byte located at the specified memory address. POKE sets the memory byte at the specified address. These commands originated with machine code monitors such as the DECsystem-10 monitor; these commands are particularly associated with the BASIC programming language, though some other languages such as Pascal and COMAL also have these commands. These commands are comparable in their roles to pointers in the C language and some other programming languages.

One of the earliest references to these commands in BASIC, if not the earliest, is in Altair BASIC. The PEEK and POKE commands were conceived in early personal computing systems to serve a variety of purposes, especially for modifying special memory-mapped hardware registers to control particular functions of the computer such as the input/output peripherals. Alternatively programmers might use these commands to copy software or even to circumvent the intent of a particular piece of software (e.g. manipulate a game program to allow the user to cheat). Today it is unusual to control computer memory at such a low level using a high-level language like BASIC. As such the notions of PEEK and POKE commands are generally seen as antiquated.

The terms peek and poke are sometimes used colloquially in computer programming to refer to memory access in general.

== Statement syntax ==
The PEEK function and POKE commands are usually invoked as follows, either in direct mode (entered and executed at the BASIC prompt) or in indirect mode (as part of a program):

integer_variable = PEEK(address)

POKE address, value

The address and value parameters may contain expressions, as long as the evaluated expressions correspond to valid memory addresses or values, respectively. A valid address in this context is an address within the computer's address space, while a valid value is (typically) an unsigned value between zero and the maximum unsigned number that the minimum addressable unit (memory cell) may hold.

== Memory cells and hardware registers ==
The address locations that are POKEd or PEEKed at may refer either to ordinary memory cells or to memory-mapped hardware registers of I/O units or support chips such as sound chips and video graphics chips, or even to memory-mapped registers of the CPU itself (which makes software implementations of powerful machine code monitors and debugging/simulation tools possible). As an example of a POKE-driven support chip control scheme, the following POKE command is directed at a specific register of the Commodore 64's built-in VIC-II graphics chip, which will make the screen border turn black:

POKE 53280, 0

A similar example from the Atari 8-bit computers tells the ANTIC display driver to turn all text upside-down:

POKE 755, 4

The difference between machines, and the importance and utility of the hard-wired memory locations, meant that "memory maps" of various machines were important documents. An example is Mapping the Atari, which starts at location zero and maps out the entire 64 kB address space, location by location.

== PEEK and POKE in other BASICs ==
North Star Computers, a vendor from the early 1980s, offered their own dialect of BASIC with their NSDOS operating system. Concerned about possible legal issues, they renamed the commands EXAM and FILL. There were also BASIC dialects that used the reserved words MEMR and MEMW instead.

BBC BASIC, used on the BBC Micro and other Acorn Computers machines, did not feature the keywords PEEK and POKE but used the question mark symbol (?), known as query in BBC BASIC, for both operations, as a function and command. For example:

> DIM W% 4  : REM reserve 4 bytes of memory, pointed to by integer variable W%
> ?W% = 42  : REM store constant 42; equivalent of 'POKE W%, 42'
> PRINT ?W% : REM print the byte pointed to by W%; equivalent of 'PRINT PEEK(W%)'
        42

32-bit values could be POKEd and PEEKed using the exclamation mark symbol (!), known as pling, with the least significant byte first (little-endian). In addition, the address could be offset by specifying either query or pling after the address and following it with the offset:

> !W% = &12345678   : REM ampersand (&) specifies hexadecimal
> PRINT ~?W%, ~W%?3 : REM tilde (~) prints in hexadecimal
        78        12

Strings of text could be PEEKed and POKEd in a similar way using the dollar sign ($). The end of the string is marked with the Carriage return character (&0D in ASCII); when read back, this terminating character is not returned. Offsets cannot be used with the dollar sign.

> DIM S% 20          : REM reserve 20 bytes of memory pointed to by S%
> $S% = "MINCE PIES" : REM store string 'MINCE PIES', terminated by &0D
> PRINT $(S% + 6)    : REM retrieve string, excluding &0D terminator, and starting at S% + 6 bytes
PIES

== 16- and 32-bit versions ==
As most early home computers used 8-bit processors, PEEK or POKE values are between 0 and 255. Setting or reading a 16-bit value on such machines requires two commands, such as PEEK(A)+256*PEEK(A+1) to read a little-endian 16-bit integer at address A, and POKE A,V followed by POKE A+1,V/256 to store a 16-bit integer V at address A.

Some BASICs, even on 8-bit machines, have commands for reading and writing 16-bit values from memory. BASIC XL for the Atari 8-bit computers uses a "D" (for "double") prefix: DPEEK and DPOKE. The East-German "Kleincomputer" KC85/1 and KC87 calls them DEEK and DOKE.

The Sinclair QL has PEEK_W and POKE_W for 16-bit values and PEEK_L and POKE_L for 32-bit values. ST BASIC for the Atari ST uses the traditional names but allows defining 8/16/32-bit memory segments and addresses that determine the size.

A Linux command line peekpoke utility has been developed mainly for ARM-based single-board computers. peekpoke is a Linux command line tool to read from and write to system memory. Its main use is to talk to hardware peripherals from userland: to read or manipulate state, and to dump registers.

== INP and OUT ==
Computers based on 8080, Z80, and 8086 processors have two address spaces: memory and ports. The INP function and OUT command allow reading and writing to the input/output port space. They are usually invoked as follows, either at the BASIC prompt or as part of a program:

integer_variable = INP(portnum)

OUT portnum, value

The portnum and value parameters may contain expressions, as long as the evaluated expressions correspond to valid port numbers or values, respectively.

== POKEs as cheats ==
In the context of games for many 8-bit computers, users could load games into memory and, before launching them, modify specific memory addresses in order to cheat, getting an unlimited number of lives, immunity, invisibility, etc. Such modifications were performed using POKE statements. The Commodore 64, ZX Spectrum and Amstrad CPC also allowed players with one of the relevant cartridges (such as Action Replay or Multiface) to freeze the running program, enter POKEs, and resume. Usually however, the POKE was typed in along with a BASIC loader which, when run, loaded the game and inserted the POKE during loading. These POKES were common features printed in the tips and cheats sections of computer magazines of the time.

For example, in Knight Lore for the ZX Spectrum, immunity can be achieved with the following command:

POKE 47196,201

In this case, the value 201 corresponds to a RET instruction, so that the game returns from a subroutine early before triggering collision detection.

Magazines such as Your Sinclair published lists of such POKEs for games. Such codes were generally identified by reverse-engineering the machine code to locate the memory address containing the desired value that related to, for example, the number of lives, detection of collisions, etc.

Using a 'POKE' cheat is more difficult in modern games, as many include anti-cheat or copy-protection measures that inhibit modification of the game's memory space. Modern operating systems enforce virtual memory protection schemes to deny external program access to non-shared memory (for example, separate page tables for each application, hence inaccessible memory spaces).

== Generic usage of POKE ==
"POKE" is sometimes used to refer to any direct manipulation of the contents of memory, rather than just via BASIC, particularly among people who learned computing on the 8-bit microcomputers of the late 1970s and early 1980s. BASIC was often the only language available on those machines (on home computers, usually present in ROM), and therefore the obvious, and simplest, way to program in machine language was to use BASIC to POKE the opcode values into memory. Doing much low-level coding like this usually came from lack of access to an assembler.

An example of the generic usage of POKE and PEEK is in Visual Basic for Windows, where DDE can be achieved with the LinkPoke keyword.

== See also ==
- Killer poke
- Type-in program
- Self-modifying code
- Pointer (computer programming)
