= CTIA and GTIA =

Custom chips used in Atari 8-bit computers

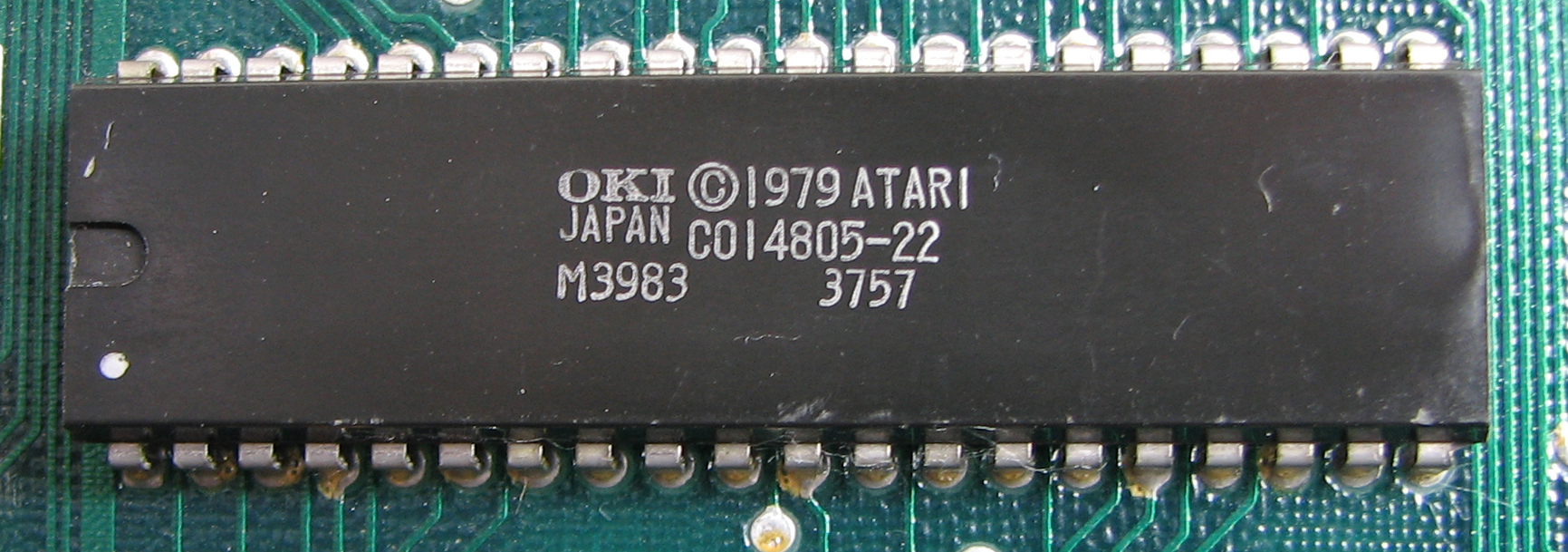
NTSC GTIA chip manufactured by Okidata

Color Television Interface Adaptor (CTIA) and its successor Graphic Television Interface Adaptor (GTIA) are custom chips used in the Atari 8-bit computers and Atari 5200 home video game console. In these systems, a CTIA or GTIA chip works together with ANTIC to produce the video display. ANTIC generates the playfield graphics (text and bitmap) while CTIA/GTIA provides the color for the playfield and adds overlay objects known as player/missile graphics (sprites). Under the direction of Jay Miner, the CTIA/GTIA chips were designed by George McLeod with the technical assistance of Steve Smith.

Color Television Interface Adaptor and Graphic Television Interface Adaptor are names of the chips as stated in the Atari field service manual. Various publications named the chips differently, sometimes using the alternative spelling Adapter or Graphics, or claiming that the "C" in "CTIA" stands for Colleen/Candy and "G" in "GTIA" is for George.

== History ==
=== Atari 2600 game console and TIA ===
Atari had created their first display driver chip, the Television Interface Adaptor (TIA) as part of the Atari 2600 console. The TIA display generates four primary moving objects (two "players" and two "missiles") on a "playfield" background. All items for one screen line are generated from simple data in memory registers and produce timed digital signals that a digital-to-analog converter and RF modulator can convert into a television display line. Between lines (during the horizontal flyback of the video beam), the 6507 microprocessor in the 2600 could change the next line's contents by updating the registers. This scheme avoided the use of a video frame buffer, which would have been far too expensive with mid-1970s RAM technology and prices. Over time, 2600 programmers developed techniques that displayed more sprites by updating the registers during a line to make it repeat the same hardware sprites.

=== CTIA ===
Atari initially estimated that the 2600 would have short market lifetime of three years when it was designed in 1976, which meant the company would need a new design by 1979. At first, this was to be an updated 2600-like game console, built around an improved similar basic design. Work on what would become the CTIA started in 1977, and aimed to deliver twice the screen resolution with twice the number of colours. Moreover, by varying the number of colours in the playfield, much higher resolutions up to 320 pixels horizontally could be supported. Players and missiles were also updated, allowing for four 8-bit players and four 2-bit missiles with an additional mode that combined the four missiles into a fifth player.

Shortly after design began, in the later half of 1977, the home computer revolution started in earnest. In response, Atari decided to release two versions of the new machine: a low-end model as a games console, and a high-end model as a home computer. Racing the beam on the 2600 was an unexpected but welcome result of its low-cost design and the company wanted the new machine to be similarly flexible. For either model, a more complex playfield would be needed, with support for character graphics in the computer role. Design of the CTIA was well advanced at this point, so instead of a redesign, a second chip was added that would effectively automate the process of racing the beam that the 2600's microprocessor had performed. Instead of the microprocessor updating the CTIA's registers based on its interrupt timing, the new ANTIC chip would handle this chore by reading video data from a frame buffer and writing it to the CTIA on the fly.

As a result of these changes, the new chips provide greatly improved number and selection of graphics modes over the TIA. Instead of a single playfield mode with 20 or 40 bits of resolution, the CTIA/ANTIC pair can display six text modes and eight graphics modes with various resolutions and color depths. This allows the programmer to choose a balance between resolution, colours, and memory use for their display.

=== CTIA vs. GTIA ===
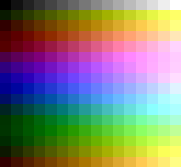
The 256 Color Palette used in the GTIA chip, (NTSC only) with 16 hues, and 16 luminance values

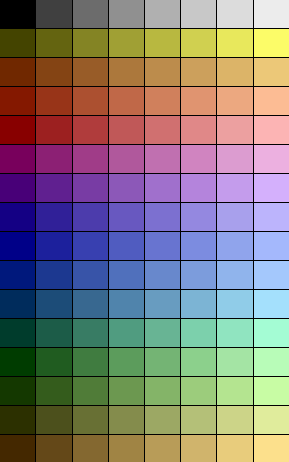
This is what the Atari TIA and CTIA used as a palette, (NTSC only) with 16 hue, and only 8 luminance values, making up 128 unique colors.

The original design of the CTIA chip also included three additional color interpretations of the normal graphics modes. This feature provides alternate expressions of ANTIC's high-resolution graphics modes presenting 1 bit per pixel, 2 colors with one-half color clock wide pixels as 4 bits per pixel, up to 16 colors, two-color clock wide pixels. This feature was ready before the computers' November 1979 debut, but was delayed so much in the development cycle that Atari had already ordered a batch of about 100,000 CTIA chips with the graphics modes missing. Not wanting to throw away the already-produced chips, the company decided to use them in the initial release of the Atari 400 and 800 models in the US market. The CTIA-equipped computers, lacking the 3 extra color modes, were shipped until October–November 1981. From this point, all new Atari units were equipped with the new chip, now called GTIA, that supported the new color interpretation modes.

The original Atari 800/400 operating system supported the GTIA alternate color interpretation modes from the start, which allowed for easy replacement of the CTIA with the GTIA once it was ready. Atari authorized service centers would install a GTIA chip in CTIA-equipped computers free of charge if the computer was under warranty; otherwise the replacement would cost $62.52.

GTIA was also mounted in all later Atari XL and XE computers and Atari 5200 consoles.

== Features ==
The list below describes CTIA/GTIA's inherent hardware capabilities meaning the intended functionality of the hardware itself, not including results achieved by CPU-serviced interrupts or display kernels driving frequent register changes.

CTIA/GTIA is a television interface device with the following features:

- Interprets the Playfield graphics data stream from ANTIC to apply color to the display.
- Merges four Player and four Missile overlay objects (aka sprites) with ANTIC's Playfield graphics. Player/Missile features include:
  - Player/Missile pixel positioning is independent of the Playfield:
    - Player/Missile objects function normally in the vertical and horizontal overscan areas beyond the displayed Playfield.
    - Player/Missile objects function normally without an ANTIC Playfield.
  - Eight-bit wide Player objects and two-bit wide Missile objects where each bit represents one displayed pixel.
  - Variable pixel width (1, 2, or 4 color clocks wide)
  - Each Player/Missile object is vertically the height of the entire screen.
  - Variable pixel height when the data is supplied by ANTIC DMA (single or double scan lines per data)
  - Ability to independently shift each P/M object by one scan line vertically when operating on double scan lines per data.
  - Each Player and its associated Missile has a dedicated color register separate from the Playfield colors.
  - Multiple priority schemes for the order of graphics layers (P/M Graphics vs playfield)
  - Color merging between Players and Playfield producing extra colors.
  - Color merging between pairs of Players producing multi-color Players.
  - Missiles can be grouped together into a Fifth Player that uses a separate color register.
  - Collision detection between Players, Missiles, and Playfield graphics.
- There are no fixed colors for normal (CTIA) color interpretation mode. All colors are generated via indirection through nine color registers. (Four for Player/Missile graphics, four for the Playfield, and one shared between the Playfield and the Fifth Player feature.)
  - Normal color interpretation mode provides choice of colors from a 128 color palette (16 colors with 8 luminance values for each)
  - A GTIA color interpretation mode can generate 16 luminances per color providing a 256 color palette.
- The GTIA version of the chip adds three alternate color interpretation modes for the Playfield graphics.
  - 16 shades of a single hue from the 16 possible hues in the Atari palette. This is accessible in Atari BASIC as Graphics 9.
  - 15 hues in a single shade/luminance value plus background. This is accessible in Atari BASIC as Graphics 11.
  - 9 colors in any hue and luminance from the palette accomplished using all the Player/Missile and Playfield color registers for the Playfield colors. This is accessible in Atari BASIC as Graphics 10.
- Reads the state of the joystick triggers (bottom buttons only for the Atari 5200 controllers).
- It includes four input/output pins that are used in different ways depending on the system:
  - In Atari 8-bit computers, three of the pins are used to read state of the console keys (Start/Select/Option).
  - The fourth pin controls the speaker built into the Atari 400/800 to generate keyboard clicks. On later models there is no speaker, but the key click is still generated by GTIA and mixed with the regular audio output.
  - In the Atari 5200, the pins are used as part of the process to read the controller keyboards.

== Versions ==
by part number

- C012295 — NTSC CTIA
- C014805 — NTSC GTIA
- C014889 — PAL GTIA
- C020120 — French SECAM GTIA (FGTIA)

Atari, Inc. intended to combine functions of the ANTIC and GTIA chips in one integrated circuit to reduce production costs of Atari computers and 5200 consoles. Two such prototype circuits were being developed, however none of them entered production.

- C020577 — CGIA
- C021737 — KERI

== Pinout ==
Atari GTIA (C014805) pin-out

Pin Name	Pin Number(s)	Description
A0 - A4	2, 1, 40, 39, 38	Address Input
AN0 - AN2	18, 19, 20	ANTIC Interface Input
COL	21	Color Frequency Output
CS	32	Chip Select Input
CSYNC	25	Composite Sync Output
D0 - D7	7, 6, 5, 4, 37, 36, 35, 34	Data Bus I/O
DEL	17	Color Delay Line Input
FØ0	29	Fast Phase Clock Output
HALT	26	Halt Input
L0 - L3	31, 22, 23, 24	Luminance Output
N/C	16	Not Connected (PAL on later versions)
OSC	28	Oscillator Input
R/W	33	Read/Write Input
S0 - S3	12, 13, 14, 15	Switch Data I/O
T0 - T3	8, 9, 10, 11	Trigger Inputs with internal pull-up
Vcc	27	Power +5 Volts
V_{ss}	3	Ground
Ø2	30	Computer Phase 2 Input

== Registers ==
The Atari 8-bit computers map CTIA/GTIA to the $D0xx_{hex} page and the Atari 5200 console maps it to the $C0xx_{hex} page.

CTIA/GTIA provides 54 Read/Write registers controlling player/missile graphics, playfield colors, joystick triggers, and console keys. Many CTIA/GTIA register addresses have dual purposes performing different functions as a Read vs a Write register. No code should read hardware registers expecting to retrieve the previously written value.

This problem is solved for many write registers by operating system shadow registers implemented in regular RAM as places to store the last value written to registers. Shadow registers are copied from RAM to the hardware registers during the vertical blank. Therefore, any write to hardware registers which have corresponding shadow registers will be overwritten by the value of the shadow registers during the next vertical blank.

Some write registers do not have corresponding shadow registers. They can be safely written by an application without the value being overwritten during the vertical blank. If the application needs to know the last state of the register then it is the responsibility of the application to remember what it wrote.

Shadow registers also exist for some read registers where reading the value directly from hardware at an unknown stage in the display cycle may return inconsistent results.

Name	Description	Read/Write	Hex Addr	Dec Addr	Shadow Name	Shadow Hex Addr	Shadow Dec Addr
HPOSP0	Horizontal Position of Player 0	Write	$D000	53248			
M0PF	Missile 0 to Playfield collisions	Read	$D000	53248			
HPOSP1	Horizontal Position of Player 1	Write	$D001	53249			
M1PF	Missile 1 to Playfield collisions	Read	$D001	53249			
HPOSP2	Horizontal Position of Player 2	Write	$D002	53250			
M2PF	Missile 2 to Playfield collisions	Read	$D002	53250			
HPOSP3	Horizontal Position of Player 3	Write	$D003	53251			
M3PF	Missile 3 to Playfield collisions	Read	$D003	53251			
HPOSM0	Horizontal Position of Missile 0	Write	$D004	53252			
P0PF	Player 0 to Playfield collisions	Read	$D004	53252			
HPOSM1	Horizontal Position of Missile 1	Write	$D005	53253			
P1PF	Player 1 to Playfield collisions	Read	$D005	53253			
HPOSM2	Horizontal Position of Missile 2	Write	$D006	53254			
P2PF	Player 2 to Playfield collisions	Read	$D006	53254			
HPOSM3	Horizontal Position of Missile 3	Write	$D007	53255			
P3PF	Player 3 to Playfield collisions	Read	$D007	53255			
SIZEP0	Size of Player 0	Write	$D008	53256			
M0PL	Missile 0 to Player collisions	Read	$D008	53256			
SIZEP1	Size of Player 1	Write	$D009	53257			
M1PL	Missile 1 to Player collisions	Read	$D009	53257			
SIZEP2	Size of Player 2	Write	$D00A	53258			
M2PL	Missile 2 to Player collisions	Read	$D00A	53258			
SIZEP3	Size of Player 3	Write	$D00B	53259			
M3PL	Missile 3 to Player collisions	Read	$D00B	53259			
SIZEM	Size of all Missiles	Write	$D00C	53260			
P0PL	Player 0 to Player collisions	Read	$D00C	53260			
GRAFP0	Graphics pattern for Player 0	Write	$D00D	53261			
P1PL	Player 1 to Player collisions	Read	$D00D	53261			
GRAFP1	Graphics pattern for Player 1	Write	$D00E	53262			
P2PL	Player 2 to Player collisions	Read	$D00E	53262			
GRAFP2	Graphics pattern for Player 2	Write	$D00F	53263			
P3PL	Player 3 to Player collisions	Read	$D00F	53263			
GRAFP3	Graphics pattern for Player 3	Write	$D010	53264			
TRIG0	Joystick 0 trigger.	Read	$D010	53264	STRIG0	$0284	644
GRAFM	Graphics pattern for all Missiles	Write	$D011	53265			
TRIG1	Joystick 1 trigger.	Read	$D011	53265	STRIG1	$0285	645
COLPM0	Color/luminance of Player and Missile 0.	Write	$D012	53266	PCOLOR0	$02C0	704
TRIG2	Joystick 2 trigger.	Read	$D012	53266	STRIG2	$0286	646
COLPM1	Color/luminance of Player and Missile 1	Write	$D013	53267	PCOLOR1	$02C1	705
TRIG3	Joystick 3 trigger.	Read	$D013	53267	STRIG3	$0287	647
COLPM2	Color/luminance of Player and Missile 2	Write	$D014	53268	PCOLOR2	$02C2	706
PAL	PAL flags	Read	$D014	53268			
COLPM3	Color/luminance of Player and Missile 3	Write	$D015	53269	PCOLOR3	$02C3	707
COLPF0	Color/luminance of Playfield 0	Write	$D016	53270	COLOR0	$02C4	708
COLPF1	Color/luminance of Playfield 1	Write	$D017	53271	COLOR1	$02C5	709
COLPF2	Color/luminance of Playfield 2	Write	$D018	53272	COLOR2	$02C6	710
COLPF3	Color/luminance of Playfield 3	Write	$D019	53273	COLOR3	$02C7	711
COLBK	Color/luminance of Playfield background	Write	$D01A	53274	COLOR4	$02C8	712
PRIOR	Priority selection, fifth player, and GTIA modes	Write	$D01B	53275	GPRIOR	$026F	623
VDELAY	Vertical Delay P/M Graphics	Write	$D01C	53276			
GRACTL	Graphics Control.	Write	$D01D	53277			
HITCLR	Clear Collisions	Write	$D01E	53278			
CONSPK	Console Speaker	Write	$D01F	53279			
CONSOL	Console Keys	Read	$D01F	53279			

In the individual register listings below the following legend applies:

Bit Value	Description
0	Bit must be 0
1	Bit must be 1
?	Bit may be either 0 or 1, and is used for a purpose.
-	Bit is unused, or should not be expected to be a certain value
label	Refer to a later explanation for the purpose of the bit.

=== Player/Missile Horizontal Coordinates ===
These registers specify the horizontal position in color clocks of the left edge (the high bit of the GRAF* byte patterns) of Player/Missile objects. Coordinates are always based on the display hardware's color clock engine, NOT simply the current Playfield display mode. This also means Player/Missile objects can be moved into overscan areas beyond the current Playfield mode.

Note that while Missile objects bit patterns share the same byte for displayed pixels (GRAFM) each Missile can be independently positioned. When the "fifth Player" option is enabled (See PRIOR/GPRIOR register) turning the four Missiles into one "Player" the Missiles switch from displaying the color of the associated Player object to displaying the value of COLPF3. The new "Player's" position on screen must be set by specifying the position of each Missile individually.

Player/Missile pixels are only rendered within the visible portions of the GTIA's pixel engine. Player/Missile objects are not rendered during the horizontal blank or the vertical blank. However, an object can be partially within the horizontal blank. The objects' pixels that fall outside of the horizontal blank are then within the visible portion of the display and can still register collisions. The horizontal position range of visible color clocks is $22_{hex}/34_{dec} to $DD_{hex}/221_{dec}.

To remove a Player/Missile object from the visible display area horizontal positions (left) 0 and (right) $DE_{hex}/222_{dec} (or greater) will insure no pixels are rendered regardless of the size of the Player/Missile object and so no unintentional collisions can be flagged.

==== HPOSP0 $D000 Write ====
Horizontal Position of Player 0

==== HPOSP1 $D001 Write ====
Horizontal Position of Player 1

==== HPOSP2 $D002 Write ====
Horizontal Position of Player 2

==== HPOSP3 $D003 Write ====
Horizontal Position of Player 3

==== HPOSM0 $D004 Write ====
Horizontal Position of Missile 0

==== HPOSM1 $D005 Write ====
Horizontal Position of Missile 1

==== HPOSM2 $D006 Write ====
Horizontal Position of Missile 2

==== HPOSM3 $D007 Write ====
Horizontal Position of Missile 3

Bit 7	Bit 6	Bit 5	Bit 4	Bit 3	Bit 2	Bit 1	Bit 0
?	?	?	?	?	?	?	?

Below are the color clock coordinates of the left and right edges of the possible Playfield sizes, useful when aligning Player/Missile objects to Playfield components:

Playfield	Width in displayed Color Clocks	Left Edge First Color Clock	Right Edge Last Color Clock
Narrow	$80_{hex}/128_{dec}	$40_{hex}/64_{dec}	$BF_{hex}/191_{dec}
Normal	$A0_{hex}/160_{dec}	$30_{hex}/48_{dec}	$CF_{hex}/207_{dec}
Wide	$B0_{hex}/176_{dec}	$28_{hex}/40_{dec}	$D7_{hex}/215_{dec}

=== Player/Missile Size Control ===
Three sizes can be chosen: Normal, Double, and Quad width. The left edge (See Horizontal Coordinates) is fixed and the size adjustment expands the Player or Missile toward the right in all cases.

- Normal - 1 bit (pixel) is 1 color clock wide
- Double - 1 bit (pixel) is 2 color clocks wide
- Quad - 1 bit (pixel) is 4 color clocks wide

Note that in Quad size a single Player/Missile pixel is the same width as an Antic Mode 2 text character. Player/Missile priority selection mixed with Quad width Player Missile graphics can be used to create multiple text colors per Mode line.

Each Player has its own size control register:

==== SIZEP0 $D008 Write ====
Size of Player 0

==== SIZEP1 $D009 Write ====
Size of Player 1

==== SIZEP2 $D00A Write ====
Size of Player 2

==== SIZEP3 $D00B Write ====
Size of Player 3

Player size controls:

Bit 7	Bit 6	Bit 5	Bit 4	Bit 3	Bit 2	Bit 1	Bit 0
-	-	-	-	-	-	Size 1	Size 0

Values:

Size	Player Width	Bits Value	Size 1	Size 0
Normal	8 color clocks	$00	0	0
Double	16 color clocks	$01	0	1
Normal	8 color clocks	$02	1	0
Quad	32 color clocks	$03	1	1

==== SIZEM $D00C Write ====
All Missile sizes are controlled by one register, but each Missile can be sized independently of the others. When the "fifth Player" option is enabled (See PRIOR/GPRIOR register) turning the four Missiles into one "Player" the width is still set by specifying the size for each Missile individually.

Bit 7	Bit 6	Bit 5	Bit 4	Bit 3	Bit 2	Bit 1	Bit 0
M3 Size 1	M3 Size 0	M2 Size 1	M2 Size 0	M1 Size 1	M1 Size 0	M0 Size 1	M0 Size 0

Values:

Missile	Size	Missile Width	Bits Value	Size 1	Size 0
Missile 0	Normal	2 color clocks	$00	0	0
	Double	4 color clocks	$01	0	1
	Normal	2 color clocks	$02	1	0
	Quad	8 color clocks	$03	1	1
Missile 1	Normal	2 color clocks	$00	0	0
	Double	4 color clocks	$04	0	1
	Normal	2 color clocks	$08	1	0
	Quad	8 color clocks	$0C	1	1
Missile 2	Normal	2 color clocks	$00	0	0
	Double	4 color clocks	$10	0	1
	Normal	2 color clocks	$20	1	0
	Quad	8 color clocks	$30	1	1
Missile 3	Normal	2 color clocks	$00	0	0
	Double	4 color clocks	$40	0	1
	Normal	2 color clocks	$80	1	0
	Quad	8 color clocks	$C0	1	1

=== Player/Missile Graphics Patterns ===
Each Player object has its own 8-bit pattern register. Missile objects share one register with 2 bits per each Missile. Once a value is set it will continue to be displayed on each scan line. With no other intervention by CPU or ANTIC DMA to update the values the result is vertical stripe patterns the height of the screen including overscan areas. This mode of operation does not incur a CPU or DMA toll on the computer. It is useful for displaying alternate colored borders and vertical lines separating screen regions.

==== GRAFP0 $D00D Write ====
Graphics pattern for Player 0

==== GRAFP1 $D00E Write ====
Graphics pattern for Player 1

==== GRAFP2 $D00F Write ====
Graphics pattern for Player 2

==== GRAFP3 $D010 Write ====
Graphics pattern for Player 3

Bit 7	Bit 6	Bit 5	Bit 4	Bit 3	Bit 2	Bit 1	Bit 0
Pixel HPOS+0	Pixel HPOS+1	Pixel HPOS+2	Pixel HPOS+3	Pixel HPOS+4	Pixel HPOS+5	Pixel HPOS+6	Pixel HPOS+7

Each Player is 8 bits (pixels) wide. Where a bit is set, a pixel is displayed in the color assigned to the color register associated to the Player. Where a bit is not set the Player object is transparent, showing Players, Missiles, Playfield pixels, or the background color. Pixel output begins at the horizontal position specified by the Player's HPOS value with the highest bit output first.

==== GRAFM $D011 Write ====
Graphics pattern for all Missiles

Bit 7	Bit 6	Bit 5	Bit 4	Bit 3	Bit 2	Bit 1	Bit 0
M3 Pixel HPOS+0	M3 Pixel HPOS+1	M2 Pixel HPOS+0	M2 Pixel HPOS+1	M1 Pixel HPOS+0	M1 Pixel HPOS+1	M0 Pixel HPOS+0	M0 Pixel HPOS+1

Each Missile is 2 bits (pixels) wide. Where a bit is set, a pixel is displayed in the color assigned to the color register for the Player associated to the Missile. When Fifth Player is enabled (see PRIOR/GPRIOR) the Missiles pixels all display COLPF3. Where a bit is not set the Missile object is transparent, showing Players, Missiles, Playfield pixels, or the background color. Pixel output begins at the horizontal position specified by the Missile's HPOS value with the highest bit output first.

Missile Values:

Missile	Bits Value	Pixel 1	Pixel 0
Missile 0	$00	0	0
	$01	0	1
	$02	1	0
	$03	1	1
Missile 1	$00	0	0
	$04	0	1
	$08	1	0
	$0C	1	1
Missile 2	$00	0	0
	$10	0	1
	$20	1	0
	$30	1	1
Missile 3	$00	0	0
	$40	0	1
	$80	1	0
	$C0	1	1

=== Player/Missile Collisions ===
CTIA/GTIA has 60 bits providing automatic detection of collisions when Player, Missile, and Playfield pixels intersect. A single bit indicates a non-zero pixel of the Player/Missile object has intersected a pixel of a specific color register. There is no collision registered for pixels rendered using the background color register/value. This system provides instant, pixel-perfect overlap comparison without expensive CPU evaluation of bounding box or image bitmap masking.

The actual color value of an object is not considered. If Player, Missile, Playfield, and Background color registers are all the same value making the objects effectively "invisible", the intersections of objects will still register collisions. This is useful for making hidden or secret objects and walls.

Obscured intersections will also register collisions. If a Player object priority is behind a Playfield color register and another Player object priority is higher (foreground) than the Playfield, and the foreground Player pixels obscure both the Playfield and the Player object behind the Playfield, then the collision between the Playfield and both the background and foreground Player objects will register along with the collision between the foreground and background Player objects.

Note that there is no Missile to Missile collision.

Player/Missile collisions can only occur when Player/Missile object pixels occur within the visible portions of the display. Player/Missile objects are not rendered during the horizontal blank or the vertical blank. The range of visible color clocks is 34 to 221, and the visible scan lines range from line 8 through line 247. Player/Missile data outside of these coordinates are not rendered and will not register collisions. An object can be partially within the horizontal blank. The objects' pixels that fall outside of the horizontal blank are within the visible portion of the display and can still register collisions.

To remove a Player/Missile object from the visible display area horizontal positions (left) 0 and (right) 222 (or greater) will insure no pixels are rendered regardless of the size of the Player/Missile object and so no unintentional collisions can be flagged.

Finally, Player, Missile, and Playfield objects collision detection is real-time, registering a collision as the image pixels are merged and output for display. Checking an object's collision bits before the object has been rendered by CTIA/GTIA will show no collision.

Once set, collisions remain in effect until cleared by writing to the HITCLR register. Effective collision response routines should occur after the targeted objects have been displayed, or at the end of a frame or during the vertical blank to react to the collisions and clear collisions before the next frame begins.

Because collisions are only a single bit, collisions are quite obviously not additive. No matter how many times and different locations a collision between pixels occurs within one frame there is only 1 bit to indicate there was a collision. A set collision bit informs a program that it can examine the related objects to identify collision locations and then decide how to react for each location.

Since HITCLR and collision detection is real-time, Display List Interrupts can divide the display into sections with HITCLR used at the beginning of each section and separate collision evaluation at the end of each section.

When the "fifth Player" option is enabled (See PRIOR/GPRIOR register) the only change is the Missiles 0 to 3 switch from displaying the color of the associated Player object to displaying the value of COLPF3. The new "Player's" collisions are still reported for the individual Missiles.

==== Player/Missile to Playfield Collisions ====
Each bit indicates a pixel of the Player/Missile object has intersected a pixel of the specified Playfield color object. There is no collision registered for the background color.

Obscured intersections will also register collisions. If a Player/Missile object priority is behind a Playfield color register and another Player/Missile object priority is higher (foreground) than the Playfield, and the foreground Player/Missile pixels obscure both the Playfield and the Player/Missile object behind the Playfield, then the collision between the Playfield and both the background and foreground Player/Missile objects will register.

High-resolution, half-color-clock pixel modes (ANTIC Modes 2, 3, and F) are treated differently. The "background" color rendered as COLPF2 where pixel values are 0 does not register a collision. High-resolution pixels are rendered as the luminance value from COLPF1. The pixels are grouped together in color clock-wide pairs (pixels 0 and 1, pixels 2 and 3, continuing to pixels 318 and 319). Where either pixel of the pair is 1 a collision is detected between the Player or Missile pixels and Playfield color COLPF2.

GTIA modes 9 and 11 do not process playfield collisions. In GTIA mode 10 Playfield collisions will register where Playfield pixels use COLPF0 through COLPF3

===== M0PF $D000 Read =====
Missile 0 to Playfield collisions

===== M1PF $D001 Read =====
Missile 1 to Playfield collisions

===== M2PF $D002 Read =====
Missile 2 to Playfield collisions

===== M3PF $D003 Read =====
Missile 3 to Playfield collisions

===== P0PF $D004 Read =====
Player 0 to Playfield collisions

===== P1PF $D005 Read =====
Player 1 to Playfield collisions

===== P2PF $D006 Read =====
Player 2 to Playfield collisions

===== P3PF $D007 Read =====
Player 3 to Playfield collisions

Bit 7	Bit 6	Bit 5	Bit 4	Bit 3	Bit 2	Bit 1	Bit 0
-	-	-	-	COLPF3	COLPF2	COLPF1	COLPF0

==== Missile to Player Collisions ====
Missiles collide with Players and Playfields. There is no Missile to Missile collision.

===== M0PL $D008 Read =====
Missile 0 to Player collisions

===== M1PL $D009 Read =====
Missile 1 to Player collisions

===== M2PL $D00A Read =====
Missile 2 to Player collisions

===== M3PL $D00B Read =====
Missile 3 to Player collisions

Bit 7	Bit 6	Bit 5	Bit 4	Bit 3	Bit 2	Bit 1	Bit 0
-	-	-	-	COLPM3	COLPM2	COLPM1	COLPM0

==== Player to Player Collisions ====
A collision between two players sets the collision bit in both Players' collision registers. When Player 0 and Player 1 collide, Player 0's collision bit for Player 1 is set, and Player 1's collision bit for Player 0 is set.

A Player cannot collide with itself, so its bit is always 0.

===== P0PL $D00C Read =====
Player 0 to Player collisions

Bit 7	Bit 6	Bit 5	Bit 4	Bit 3	Bit 2	Bit 1	Bit 0
-	-	-	-	COLPM3	COLPM2	COLPM1	0

===== P1PL $D00D Read =====
Player 1 to Player collisions

Bit 7	Bit 6	Bit 5	Bit 4	Bit 3	Bit 2	Bit 1	Bit 0
-	-	-	-	COLPM3	COLPM2	0	COLPM0

===== P2PL $D00E Read =====
Player 2 to Player collisions

Bit 7	Bit 6	Bit 5	Bit 4	Bit 3	Bit 2	Bit 1	Bit 0
-	-	-	-	COLPM3	0	COLPM1	COLPM0

===== P3PL $D00F Read =====
Player 3 to Player collisions

Bit 7	Bit 6	Bit 5	Bit 4	Bit 3	Bit 2	Bit 1	Bit 0
-	-	-	-	0	COLPM2	COLPM1	COLPM0

=== Player/Missile and Playfield Color and Luminance ===
All Player/Missile objects' pixels and all Playfield pixels in the default CTIA/GTIA color interpretation mode use indirection to specify color. Indirection means that the values of the pixel data do not directly specify the color, but point to another source of information for color. CTIA/GTIA contain hardware registers that set the values used for colors, and the pixels' information refer to these registers. The palette on the Atari is 8 luminance levels of 16 colors for a total 128 colors. The color indirection flexibility allows a program to tailor the screen's colors to fit the purpose of the program's display.

All hardware color registers have corresponding shadow registers.

==== COLPM0 $D012 Write ====
SHADOW: PCOLOR0 $02C0

Color/luminance of Player and Missile 0.

When GTIA 9-color mode is enabled (PRIOR/GPRIOR value $80) this register is used for the border and background (Playfield pixel value 0), rather than COLBK.

==== COLPM1 $D013 Write ====
SHADOW: PCOLOR1 $02C1

Color/luminance of Player and Missile 1.

==== COLPM2 $D014 Write ====
SHADOW: PCOLOR2 $02C2

Color/luminance of Player and Missile 2.

==== COLPM3 $D015 Write ====
SHADOW: PCOLOR3 $02C3

Color/luminance of Player and Missile 3.

==== COLPF0 $D016 Write ====
SHADOW: COLOR0 $02C4

Color/luminance of Playfield 0.

==== COLPF1 $D017 Write ====
SHADOW: COLOR1 $02C5

Color/luminance of Playfield 1.

This register is used for the set pixels (value 1) in ANTIC text modes 2 and 3, and map mode F. Only the luminance portion is used and is OR'd with the color value of COLPF2. In other Character and Map modes this register provides the expected color and luminance for a pixel.

==== COLPF2 $D018 Write ====
SHADOW: COLOR2 $02C6

Color/luminance of Playfield 2.

This register is used for Playfield background color of ANTIC text modes 2 and 3, and map mode F. That is, where pixel value 0 is used. In other Character and Map modes this register provides the expected color and luminance for a pixel.

==== COLPF3 $D019 Write ====
SHADOW: COLOR3 $02C7

Color/luminance of Playfield 3

COLPF3 is available is several special circumstances:

- When Missiles are converted to the "fifth Player" they switch from displaying the color of the associated Player object to displaying COLPF3 and change priority. See PRIOR/GPRIOR register.
- Playfield Text Modes 4 and 5. Inverse video characters (high bit $80 set) cause CTIA/GTIA to substitute COLPF3 value for COLPF2 pixels in the character matrix. (See ANTIC's Glyph Rendering)
- Playfield Text Modes 6 and 7. When the character value has bits 6 and 7 set (character range $C0-FF) the entire character pixel matrix is displayed in COLPF3. (See ANTIC's Glyph Rendering)
- This register is also available in GTIA's special 9 color, pixel indirection color mode.

==== COLBK $D01A Write ====
SHADOW: COLOR4 $02C8

Color/luminance of Playfield background.

The background color is displayed where no other pixel occurs through the entire overscan display area. The following exceptions occur for the background:

- In ANTIC text modes 2 and 3, and map mode F the background of the playfield area where pixels may be rendered is from COLPF2 and the COLBK color appears as a border around the playfield.
- In GTIA color interpretation mode $8 (9 color indirection) the display background color is provided by color register COLPM0 while COLBAK is used for Playfield pixel value $8.
- In GTIA color interpretation mode $C (15 colors in one luminance level, plus background) uses COLBK to set the luminance level of all other pixels (pixel value $1 through $F). However, the background itself uses only the color component set in the COLBK register. The luminance value of the background is forced to 0.

Color Registers Bits:

Bit 7	Bit 6	Bit 5	Bit 4	Bit 3	Bit 2	Bit 1	Bit 0
Color 3	Color 2	Color 1	Color 0	Luminance 3	Luminance 2	Luminance 1	(Luminance 0)

The high nybble of the color register specifies one of 16 colors color ($00, $10, $20... to $F0).

The low nybble of the register specifies one of 16 luminance values ($00, $01, $02... to $0F).

In the normal color interpretation mode the lowest bit is not significant and only 8 luminance values are available ($00, $02, $04, $06, $08, $0A, $0C, $0E), so the complete color palette is 128 color values.

In GTIA color interpretation mode $4 (luminance-only mode) the full 16 bits of luminance values are available for Playfield pixels providing a palette of 256 colors. Any Player/Missile objects displayed in this mode are colored by indirection which still uses the 128 color palette.

In normal color interpretation mode the pixel values range from $0 to $3 ordinarily pointing to color registers COLBK, COLPF0, COLPF1, COLPF2 respectively. The color text modes also include options to use COLPF3 for certain ranges of character values. See ANTIC's graphics modes for more information.

When Player/Missile graphics patterns are enabled for display where the graphics patterns bits are set the color displayed comes from the registers assigned to the objects.

There are exceptions for color generation and display:

- ANTIC Text modes 2 and 3, and Map mode F:
  - The pixel values in these modes is only $0 and $1. The $0 pixels specify the Playfield background which is color register COLPF2. The $1 pixels use the color component of COLPF2, and the luminance specified by COLPF1. The border around the Playfield uses the color from COLBK.
  - ANTIC Text modes 2 and 3, and Map mode F behave differently with Player/Missile graphics from the other modes. COLPF1 used for the glyph or graphics pixels always has the highest priority and cannot be obscured by Players or Missiles. The color of COLPF1 always comes from the "background" which is ordinarily COLPF2. Therefore, where Players/Missiles and Fifth Player have priority over COLPF2 the COLPF1 glyph/graphics pixels use the color component of the highest priority color (Player or Missile), and the luminance component of COLPF1. This behavior is consistent where Player/Missile priority conflicts result in true black for the "background". In summary, the color CTIA/GTIA finally determines to use "behind" the high-res pixel is then used to "tint" the COLPF1 foreground glyph/graphics pixels.
- GTIA Exceptions
  - GTIA color interpretation mode $8 (9 color indirection) uses color register COLPM0 for the display background and border color while COLBAK is used for Playfield pixel value $8.
  - GTIA color interpretation mode $C (15 colors in one luminance level, plus background) uses COLBK to set the luminance level of all other pixels (pixel value $1 through $F). However, the background itself uses only the color component set in the COLBK register. The luminance value of the background is forced to 0. Note that the background's color component is also OR'd with the other pixels' colors. Therefore, the overall number of colors in the mode is reduced when the background color component is not black (numerically zero).
- Player/Missile Exceptions:
  - Player/Missile Priority value $0 (See PRIOR/GPRIOR) will cause overlapping Player and Playfield pixels to be OR'd together displaying a different color.
  - Conflicting Player/Missile Priority configuration will cause true black (color 0, luma 0) to be output where conflicts occur.
  - The Player/Missile Multi-Color option will cause overlapping Player pixels to be OR'd together displaying a different color.

Color register use per ANTIC character modes:

Register	ANTIC 2	ANTIC 3	ANTIC 4	ANTIC 5	ANTIC 6	ANTIC 7
COLPM0/PCOLOR0						
COLPM1/PCOLOR1						
COLPM2/PCOLOR2						
COLPM3/PCOLOR3						
COLPF0/COLOR0			glyph pixel	glyph pixel	glyph	glyph
COLPF1/COLOR1	glyph pixel (luma)	glyph pixel (luma)	glyph pixel	glyph pixel	glyph	glyph
COLPF2/COLOR2	background	background	glyph pixel	glyph pixel	glyph	glyph
COLPF3/COLOR3			glyph pixel	glyph pixel	glyph	glyph
COLBAK/COLOR4	border	border	background	background	background	background

Color registers use per ANTIC map modes:

Register	ANTIC 0 (blank lines)	ANTIC 8	ANTIC 9	ANTIC A	ANTIC B	ANTIC C	ANTIC D	ANTIC E	ANTIC F
COLPM0/PCOLOR0									
COLPM1/PCOLOR1									
COLPM2/PCOLOR2									
COLPM3/PCOLOR3									
COLPF0/COLOR0		pixel	pixel	pixel	pixel	pixel	pixel	pixel	
COLPF1/COLOR1		pixel		pixel			pixel	pixel	pixel (luma)
COLPF2/COLOR2		pixel		pixel			pixel	pixel	background
COLPF3/COLOR3									
COLBAK/COLOR4	background	background	background	background	background	background	background	background	border

Color registers use per GTIA modes (ANTIC F):

Register	GTIA $4 (BASIC 9)	GTIA $8 (BASIC 10)	GTIA $C (BASIC 11)
COLPM0/PCOLOR0		background	
COLPM1/PCOLOR1		pixel	
COLPM2/PCOLOR2		pixel	
COLPM3/PCOLOR3		pixel	
COLPF0/COLOR0		pixel	
COLPF1/COLOR1		pixel	
COLPF2/COLOR2		pixel	
COLPF3/COLOR3		pixel	
COLBAK/COLOR4	background base color	pixel	background base luma

Player/Missile colors are always available for Player/Missile objects in all modes, though colors may be modified when the special GTIA modes (16 shades/16 color) are in effect.

=== Miscellaneous Player/Missile and GTIA Controls ===
==== PRIOR $D01B Write ====
SHADOW: GPRIOR $026F

This register controls several CTIA/GTIA color management features: The GTIA Playfield color interpretation mode, Multi-Color Player objects, the Fifth Player, and Player/Missile/Playfield priority.

Bit 7	Bit 6	Bit 5	Bit 4	Bit 3	Bit 2	Bit 1	Bit 0
GTIA Mode 1	GTIA Mode 0	Multi-Color Player	Fifth Player	Priority 3	Priority 2	Priority 1	Priority 0

===== GTIA Playfield Color Interpretations =====
CTIA includes only one default color interpretation mode for the ANTIC Playfield data stream. That is the basic functionality assumed in the majority of the ANTIC and CTIA/GTIA discussion unless otherwise noted. GTIA includes three alternate color interpretations modes for Playfield data. These modes work by pairing adjacent color clocks from ANTIC, thus the pixels output by GTIA are always two color clocks wide. Although these modes can be engaged while displaying any ANTIC Playfield Mode, the full color palette possible with these GTIA color processing options are only realized in the ANTIC Modes based on 1/2 color clock pixels (ANTIC modes 2, 3, F.) These GTIA options are most often used with a Mode F display. The special GTIA color processing modes also alter the display or behavior of Player/Missile graphics in various ways.

The color interpretation control is a global function of GTIA affecting the entire screen. GTIA is not inherently capable of mixing on one display the various GTIA color interpretation modes and the default CTIA mode needed for most ANTIC Playfields. Mixing color interpretation modes requires software writing to the PRIOR register as the display is generated (usually, by a Display List Interrupt).

PRIOR bits 7 and 6 provide four values specifying the color interpretation modes:

GTIA Mode Bits [7:6]	Feature	Description
0 0 = $00	Default	Same as CTIA. Normal color register usage.
0 1 = $40	GTIA/16 Shades	16 shades of background color ( COLBK )
1 0 = $80	GTIA/9 color	All nine Playfield and Player/Missile color registers are available on the Playfield. The background is COLPM0
1 1 = $C0	GTIA/16 Color	15 colors at one luminance level set by the background register (COLBK), plus the background.

===== 16 Shades =====
This mode uses the COLBK register to specify the background color. Rather than using indirection, pixel values directly represent Luminance. This mode allows all four luminance bits to be used in the Atari color palette and so is capable of displaying 256 colors.

Player/Missile graphics (without the fifth Player option) display properly in this mode, however collision detection with the Playfield is disabled. Playfield priority is always on the bottom. When the Missiles are switched to act as a fifth Player then where the Missile objects overlap the Playfield the Missile pixels luminance merges with the Playfield pixels' Luminance value.

===== 9 Color =====
Unlike the other two special GTIA modes, this mode is entirely driven by color indirection. All nine color registers work on the display for pixel values 0 through 8. The remaining 7 pixel values repeat previous color registers.

The pixels are delayed by one color clock (half a GTIA mode pixel) when output. This offset permits interesting effects. For an example, page flipping rapidly between this mode and a different GTIA mode produces a display with apparent higher resolution and greater number of colors.

This mode is unique in that is uses color register COLPM0 for the border and background (Playfield 0 value pixels) rather than COLBK.

Player/Missile graphics display properly with the exception that Player/Missile 0 are not distinguishable from the background pixels, since they use the same color register, COLPM0. The Playfield pixels using the Player/Missile colors are modified by priority settings as if they were Player/Missile objects and so can affect the display of Players/Missiles. (See discussion later about Player/Missile/Playfield priorities).

The Playfield pixels using Player/Missile colors do not trigger collisions when Player/Missile objects overlay them. However, Player/Missile graphics overlapping Playfield colors COLPF0 to COLPF3 will trigger the expected collision.

===== 16 Colors =====
This mode uses the COLBK register to specify the luminance of all Playfield pixels (values 1_{hex}/1_{dec} through F_{hex}/15_{dec}.) The least significant bit of the luminance value is not observed, so only the standard/CTIA 8 luminance values are available ($0, $2, $4, $6, $8, $A, $C, $E). Additionally, the background itself uses only the color component set in the COLBK register. The luminance value of the background is forced to 0. As with the Luminance mode indirection is disabled and pixel values directly represent a color.

Note that the color component of the background also merges with the playfield pixels. Colors other than black for the background reduce the overall number of colors displayed in the mode.

Player/Missile graphics (without the fifth Player option) display properly in this mode, however collision detection with the Playfield is disabled. Playfield priority is always on the bottom. When the Missiles are switched to act as a fifth Player then where the Missile objects overlap the Playfield the Missile pixels inherit the Playfield pixels' Color value.

===== Multi-Color Player =====
PRIOR bit 5, value 20_{hex}/32_{dec} enables Multi-Color Player objects. Where pixels of two Player/Missile objects overlap a third color appears. This is implemented by eliminating priority processing between pairs of Player/Missile objects resulting in CTIA/GTIA performing a bitwise OR of the two colored pixels to output a new color.

Example: A Player pixel with color value 98_{hex}/152_{dec} (blue) overlaps a Player pixel with color value 46_{hex}/70_{dec} (red) resulting in a pixel color of DE_{hex}/228_{dec} (light green/yellow).

The Players/Missiles pairs capable of Multi-Color output:

- Player 0 + Player 1
- Missile 0 + Missile 1
- Player 2 + Player 3
- Missile 2 + Missile 3

===== Fifth Player =====
PRIOR bit 4, value $10_{hex}/16_{dec} enables Missiles to become a fifth Player. No functional change occurs to the Missile other than the color processing of the Missiles. Normally the Missiles display using the color of the associated Player. When Fifth Player is enabled all Missiles display the color of Playfield 3 (COLPF3). Horizontal position, size, vertical delay, and Player/Missile collisions all continue to operate the same way. The priority of the Fifth Player for Player objects pixel intersections is COLPF3, but the Fifth Player's pixels have priority over all Playfield colors.

The color processing change also causes some exceptions for the Missiles' display in GTIA's alternative color modes:

- GTIA 16 Shades mode: Where Missile pixels overlap the Playfield the pixels inherit the Playfield pixels' Luminance value.
- GTIA 16 Colors mode: Where Missile pixels overlap the Playfield the pixels inherit the Playfield pixels' Color value.

The Fifth Player introduces an exception for Priority value $8 (bits 1000) (See Priority discussion below.)

===== Priority =====
PRIOR bits 3 to 0 provide four Player/Missile and Playfield priority values that determine which pixel value is displayed when Player/Missile objects pixels and Playfield pixels intersect. The four values provide specific options listed in the Priority chart below. "PM" mean normal Player/Missile implementation without the Fifth Player. The Fifth Player, "P5", is shown where its priority occurs when it is enabled.

The chart is accurate for ANTIC Playfield Character and Map modes using the default (CTIA) color interpretation mode. GTIA color interpretation modes, and the ANTIC modes based on high-resolution, 1/2 color clock pixels behave differently (noted later).

Priority Bits [3:0]	0 0 0 1 = $1	0 0 1 0 = $2	0 1 0 0 = $4	1 0 0 0 = $8	0 0 0 0 = $0
Top	PM0	PM0	P5/PF0	P5/PF0	PM0
	PM1	PM1	PF1	PF1	PM1
	PM2	P5/PF0	PF2	PM0	P5/PF0
	PM3	PF1	PF3	PM1	PF1
	P5/PF0	PF2	PM0	PM2	PM2
	PF1	PF3	PM1	PM3	PM3
	PF2	PM2	PM2	PF2	PF2
	PF3	PM3	PM3	PF3	PF3
Bottom	COLBK	COLBK	COLBK	COLBK	COLBK

If multiple bits are set, then where there is a conflict CTIA/GTIA outputs a black pixel—Note that black means actual black, not simply the background color, COLBK.

Although the Fifth Player is displayed with the value of COLPF3, its priority is above all Playfield colors. This produces an exception for Priority value $8 (Bits 1000). In this mode Playfield 0 and 1 are higher priority than the Players, and the Players are higher priority than Playfield 2 and 3. Where Playfield 0 or 1 pixels intersect any Player pixel the result displayed is the Playfield pixel. However, if the Fifth player also intersects the same location, its value is shown over the Playfield causing it to appear as if Playfield 3 has the highest priority. If the Playfield 0 or 1 pixel is removed from this intersection then the Fifth Player's pixel has no Playfield pixel to override and so also falls behind the Player pixels.

When the Priority bits are all 0 a different effect occurs—Player and Playfield pixels are logically OR'd together in the a manner similar to the Multi-Color Player feature. In this situation Players 0 and 1 pixels can mix with Playfield 0 and 1 pixels, and Players 2 and 3 pixels can mix with Playfield 2 and 3 pixels. Additionally, when the Multi-Color Player option is used the resulting merged Players' color can also mix with the Playfield producing more colors. When all color merging possibilities are considered, the CTIA/GTIA hardware can output 23 colors per scan line. Starting with the background color as the first color, the remaining 22 colors and color merges are possible:

Color	COLPM0	COLPM1	COLPF0	COLPF1	Color	COLPM2	COLPM3	COLPF2	COLPF3
1	X				12	X			
2		X			13		X		
3	X	X			14	X	X		
4			X		15			X	
5	X		X		16	X		X	
6		X	X		17		X	X	
7	X	X	X		18	X	X	X	
8				X	19				X
9	X			X	20	X			X
10		X		X	21		X		X
11	X	X		X	22	X	X		X

When Priority bits are all 0 the Missiles colors function the same way as the corresponding Players as described above. When Fifth Player is enabled, the Missile pixels cause the same color merging as shown for COLPF3 in the table above (colors 19 through 22).

===== Priority And High-Resolution Modes =====
The priority result differ for the Character and Map modes using high-resolution, 1/2 color clock pixels—ANTIC modes 2, 3, and F. These priority handling differences can be exploited to produce color text or graphics in these modes that are traditionally thought of as "monochrome".

In these ANTIC modes COLPF2 is output as the "background" of the Playfield and COLBK is output as the border around the Playfield. The graphics or glyph pixels are output using only the luminance component of COLPF1 mixed with the color component of the background (usually COLPF2).

The priority relationship between Players/Missiles, and COLPF2 work according to the priority chart below. Player/Missile pixels with higher priorities will replace COLPF2 as the "background" color. COLPF1 always has the highest priority and cannot be obscured by Players or Missiles. The glyph/graphics pixels use the color component of highest priority color (Playfield, Player, or Missile), and the luminance component of COLPF1. Note that this behavior is also consistent where Player/Missile priority conflicts result in true black for the "background". In effect, the color value CTIA/GTIA finally uses for the "background" color "tints" the COLPF1 foreground glyph/graphics pixels.

Priority Bits [3:0]	COLPF2 vs COLPM0 and COLPM1	COLPF2 vs COLPM2 and COLPM3
0 0 0 0 = $00	Player/Missile	Player/Missile OR'd with COLPF2
0 0 0 1 = $01	Player/Missile	Player/Missile
0 0 1 0 = $02	Player/Missile	COLPF2
0 0 1 1 = $03	Player/Missile	True Black
0 1 0 0 = $04	COLPF2	COLPF2
0 1 0 1 = $05	COLPF2	True Black
0 1 1 0 = $06	COLPF2	COLPF2
0 1 1 1 = $07	COLPF2	True Black
1 0 0 0 = $08	Player/Missile	Player/Missile
1 0 0 1 = $09	Player/Missile	Player/Missile
1 0 1 0 = $0A	Player/Missile	True Black
1 0 1 1 = $0B	Player/Missile	True Black
1 1 0 0 = $0C	COLPF2	True Black
1 1 0 1 = $0D	COLPF2	True Black
1 1 1 0 = $0E	COLPF2	True Black
1 1 1 1 = $0F	COLPF2	True Black

==== VDELAY $D01C Write ====
Vertical Delay P/M Graphics

Bit 7	Bit 6	Bit 5	Bit 4	Bit 3	Bit 2	Bit 1	Bit 0
Player 3	Player 2	Player 1	Player 0	Missile 3	Missile 2	Missile 1	Missile 0

This register is used to provide single scan line movement when Double Line Player/Missile resolution is enabled in ANTIC's DMACTL register. This works by masking ANTIC DMA updates to the GRAF* registers on even scan lines, causing the graphics pattern to shift down one scan line.

Since Single Line resolution requires ANTIC DMA updates on each scan line and VDELAY masks the updates on even scan lines, then this bit reduces Single line Player/Missile resolution to Double line.

==== GRACTL $D01D Write ====
Graphics Control

Bit 7	Bit 6	Bit 5	Bit 4	Bit 3	Bit 2	Bit 1	Bit 0
?	?	?	?	?	Trigger Latch	Enable Players	Enable Missiles

GRACTL controls CTIA/GTIA's receipt of Player/Missile DMA data from ANTIC and toggles the mode of Joystick trigger input.

Receipt of Player/Missile DMA data requires CTIA/GTIA be configured to receive the data. This is done with a pair of bits in GRACTL that match a pair of bits in ANTIC's DMACTL register that direct ANTIC to send Player data and Missile data. GRACTL's Bit 0 corresponds to DMACTL's Bit 2, enabling transfer of Missile data. GRACTL's Bit 1 corresponds to DMACTL's Bit 3, enabling transfer of Player data. These bits must be set for GTIA to receive Player/Missile data from ANTIC via DMA. When Player/Missile graphics are being operated directly by the CPU then these bits must be off.

The joystick trigger registers report the pressed/not pressed state in real-time. If a program's input polling may not be frequent enough to catch momentary joystick button presses, then the triggers can be set to lock in the closed/pressed state and remain in that state even after the button is released. Setting GRACTL Bit 2 enables the latching of all triggers. Clearing the bit returns the triggers to the unlatched, real-time behavior.

==== HITCLR $D01E Write ====
Clear Collisions

Bit 7	Bit 6	Bit 5	Bit 4	Bit 3	Bit 2	Bit 1	Bit 0
?	?	?	?	?	?	?	?

Any write to this register clears all the Player/Missile collision detection bits.

=== Other CTIA/GTIA Functions ===
==== Joystick Triggers ====
===== TRIG0 $D010 Read =====
SHADOW: STRIG0 $0284

Joystick 0 trigger

===== TRIG1 $D011 Read =====
SHADOW: STRIG1 $0285

Joystick 1 trigger.

===== TRIG2 $D012 Read =====
SHADOW: STRIG2 $0286

Joystick 2 trigger.

===== TRIG3 $D013 Read =====
SHADOW: STRIG3 $0287

Joystick 3 trigger

Bit 7	Bit 6	Bit 5	Bit 4	Bit 3	Bit 2	Bit 1	Trigger
0	0	0	0	0	0	0	?

Bits 7 through 1 are always 0. Bit 0 reports the state of the joystick trigger. Value 1 indicates the trigger is not pressed. Value 0 indicates the trigger is pressed.

The trigger registers report button presses in real-time. The button pressed state will instantly clear when the button is released.

The triggers may be configured to latch, that is, lock, in the pressed state and remain that way until specifically cleared. GRACTL bit 2 enables the latch behavior for all triggers. Clearing GRACTL bit 2 returns all triggers to real-time behavior.

==== PAL $D014 Read ====
PAL flags.

Bit 7	Bit 6	Bit 5	Bit 4	Bit 3	Bit 2	Bit 1	Bit 0
-	-	-	-	Video 3	Video 2	Video 1	Video 0

This register reports the display standard for the system. When Bits 3 to 0 are set to 1 (value $f_{hex}/15_{dec}) the system is operating in NTSC. When the bits are zero the system is operating in PAL mode.

==== CONSPK $D01F Write ====
Console Speaker

Bit 7	Bit 6	Bit 5	Bit 4	Bit 3	Bit 2	Bit 1	Bit 0
0	0	0	0	Speaker	-	-	-

Bit3 controls the internal speaker of the Atari 800/400. In later models the console speaker is removed and the sound is mixed with the regular POKEY audio signals for output to the monitor port and RF adapter. The Atari OS uses the console speaker to output the keyboard click and the bell/buzzer sound.

The Operating System sets the speaker bit during the vertical blank routine. Repeatedly writing 0 to the bit will produce a 60 Hz buzzing sound as the vertical blank resets the value. Useful tones can be generated using 6502 code effectively adding a fifth audio channel, albeit a channel requiring CPU time to maintain the audio tones.

==== CONSOL $D01F Read ====
Console Keys

Bit 7	Bit 6	Bit 5	Bit 4	Bit 3	Bit 2	Bit 1	Bit 0
-	-	-	-	-	Option	Select	Start

A bit is assigned to report the state of each of the special console keys, Start, Select, and Option. Bit value 0 indicates a key is pressed and 1 indicates the key is not pressed. Key/Bit values:

- Start Key = Bit value $1
- Select Key = Bit value $2
- Option Key = Bit value $4

== Player/Missile Graphics (sprites) operation ==
A hardware "sprite" system is handled by CTIA/GTIA. The official ATARI name for the sprite system is "Player/Missile Graphics", since it was designed to reduce the need to manipulate display memory for fast-moving objects, such as the "player" and his weapons, "missiles", in a shoot 'em up game.

A Player is essentially a glyph 8 pixels wide and 256 TV lines tall, and has two colors: the background (transparent) (0 in the glyph) and the foreground (1). A Missile object is similar, but only 2 pixels wide. CTIA/GTIA combines the Player/Missile objects' pixels with the Playfield pixels according to their priority. Transparent (0) player pixels have no effect on the Playfield and display either a Playfield or background pixel without change. All Player/Missile objects' normal pixel width is one color clock. A register value can set the Player or Missile pixels' width to 1, 2, or 4 color clocks wide.

The Player/Missile implementation by CTIA/GTIA is similar to the TIA's. A Player is an 8-bit value or pattern at a specified horizontal position which automatically repeats for each scan line or until the pattern is changed in the register. Missiles are 2-bits wide and share one pattern register, so that four, 2-bit wide values occupy the 8-bit wide pattern register, but each missile has an independent horizontal position and size. Player/Missile objects extend the height of the display including the screen border. That is, the default implementation of Player/Missile graphics by CTIA/GTIA is a stripe down the screen. While seemingly limited this method facilitates Player/Missile graphics use as alternate colored vertical borders or separators on a display, and when priority values are set to put Player/Missile pixels behind playfield pixels they can be used to add additional colors to a display. All Players and Missiles set at maximum width and placed side by side can cover the entire normal width Playfield.

CTIA/GTIA supports several options controlling Player/Missile color. The PRIOR/GPRIOR register value can switch the four Missiles between two color display options—each Missile (0 to 3) expresses the color of the associated Player object (0 to 3) or all Missiles show the color of register COLPF3/COLOR3. When Missiles are similarly colored they can be treated as a fifth player, but correct placement on screen still requires storing values in all four Missile Horizontal Position registers. PRIOR/GPRIOR also controls a feature that causes the overlapping pixels of two Players to generate a third color allowing multi-colored Player objects at the expense of reducing the number of available objects. Finally, PRIOR/GPRIOR can be used to change the foreground/background layering (called, "priority") of Player/Missile pixels vs Playfield pixels, and can create priority conflicts that predictably affect the colors displayed.

The conventional idea of a sprite with an image/pattern that varies vertically is also built into the Player/Missile graphics system. The ANTIC chip includes a feature to perform DMA to automatically feed new pixel patterns to CTIA/GTIA as the display is generated. This can be done for each scan line or every other scan line resulting in Player/Missile pixels one or two scan lines tall. In this way the Player/Missile object could be considered an extremely tall character in a font, 8 bits/pixels wide, by the height of the display.

Moving the Player/Missile objects horizontally is as simple as changing a register in the CTIA/GTIA (in Atari BASIC, a single POKE statement moves a player or missile horizontally). Moving an object vertically is achieved by either block moving the definition of the glyph to a new location in the Player or Missile bitmap, or by rotating the entire Player/Missile bitmap (128 or 256 bytes). The worst case rotation of the entire bitmap is still quite fast in 6502 machine language, even though the 6502 lacks a block-move instruction found in the 8080. Since the sprite is exactly 128 or 256 bytes long, the indexing can be easily accommodated in a byte-wide register on the 6502. Atari BASIC lacks a high speed memory movement command and moving memory using BASIC PEEK()s and POKE(s) is painfully slow. Atari BASIC programs using Player/Missile graphics have other options for performing high speed memory moves. One method is calling a short machine language routine via the USR() function to perform the memory moves. Another option is utilizing a large string as the Player/Missile memory map and performing string copy commands which result in memory movement at machine language speed.

Careful use of Player/Missile graphics with the other graphics features of the Atari hardware can make graphics programming, particularly games, significantly simpler.

== GTIA enhancements ==
The GTIA chip is backward compatible with the CTIA, and adds 3 color interpretations for the 14 "normal" ANTIC Playfield graphics modes. The normal color interpretation of the CTIA chip is limited, per scanline, to a maximum of 4 colors in Map modes or 5 colors in Text modes (plus 4 colors for Player/Missile graphics) unless special programming techniques are used. The three, new color interpretations in GTIA provide a theoretical total of 56 graphics modes (14 ANTIC modes multiplied by four possible color interpretations). However, only the graphics modes based on high-resolution, 1/2 color clock pixels (that is, Antic text modes 2, 3, and graphics mode F) are capable of fully expressing the color palettes of these 3 new color interpretations. The three additional color interpretations use the information in two color clocks (four bits) to generate a pixel in one of 16 color values. This changes a mode F display from 2 colors per pixel, 320 pixels horizontally, one scan line per mode line, to 16 colors and 80 pixels horizontally. The additional color interpretations allow the following:

- GTIA color interpretation mode $4 — 16 shades of a single hue (set by the background color, COLBK) from the 16 possible hues in the Atari palette. This is also accessible in Atari BASIC as Graphics 9.
- GTIA color interpretation mode $8 — This mode allows 9 colors of indirection per horizontal line in any hue and luminance from the entire Atari palette of 128 colors. This is accomplished using all the Player/Missile and Playfield color registers for the Playfield pixels. In this mode the background color is provided by color register COLPM0 while COLBAK is used for Playfield pixel value $8. This mode is accessible in Atari BASIC as Graphics 10,
- GTIA color interpretation mode $C — 15 hues in a single shade/luminance value, plus the background. The value of the background, COLBK sets the luminance level of all other pixels (pixel value $1 through $F). The least significant bit of the luminance value is not observed, so only the standard/CTIA 8 luminance values are available ($0, $2, $4, $6, $8, $A, $C, $E). Additionally, the background itself uses only the color component set in the COLBK register. The luminance value of the background is forced to 0. This mode is accessible in Atari BASIC as Graphics 11.

Of these modes, Atari BASIC Graphics 9 is particularly notable. It enables the Atari to display grayscale digitized photographs, which despite their low resolution were very impressive at the time. Additionally, by allowing 16 shades of a single hue rather than the 8 shades available in other graphics modes, it increases the amount of different colors the Atari could display from 128 to 256. Unfortunately, this feature is limited for use in this mode only, which due to its low resolution was not widely used.

The Antic 2 and 3 text modes are capable of displaying the same color ranges as mode F graphics when using the GTIA's alternate color interpretations. However, since the pixel reduction also applies and turns 8 pixel wide, 2 color text into 2 pixel wide, 16 color blocks these modes are unsuitable for actual text, and so these graphics modes are not popular outside of demos. Effective use of the GTIA color interpretation feature with text modes requires a carefully constructed character set treating characters as pixels. This method allows display of an apparent GTIA "high resolution" graphics mode that would ordinarily occupy 8K of RAM to instead use only about 2K (1K for the character set, and 1K for the screen RAM and display list.)

The GTIA also fixed an error in CTIA that caused graphics to be misaligned by "half a color clock". The side effect of the fix was that programs that relied on color artifacts in high-resolution monochrome modes would show a different pair of colors.

Atari owners can determine if their machine is equipped with the CTIA or GTIA by executing the BASIC command POKE 623,64. If the screen blackens after execution, the machine is equipped with the new GTIA chip. If it stays blue, the machine has a CTIA chip instead.

== Bugs ==
The last Atari XE computers made for the Eastern European market were built in China. Many if not all have a buggy PAL GTIA chip. The luma values in Graphics 9 and higher are at fault, appearing as stripes. Replacing the chip fixes the problem. Also, there have been attempts to fix faulty GTIA chips with some external circuitry.

== See also ==
- List of home computers by video hardware
