= Sprite (computer graphics) =

2D bitmap displayed over a larger scene

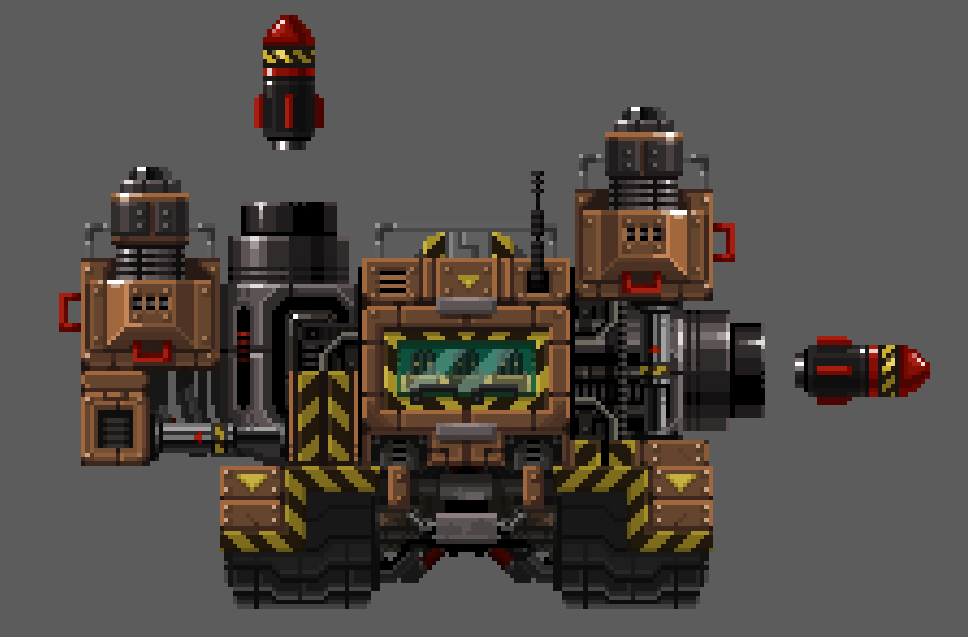
Tank and rocket sprites from Broforce

In computer graphics, a sprite is a two-dimensional bitmap that is integrated into a larger scene, most often in a 2D video game. Originally, the term sprite referred to fixed-sized objects composited together, by hardware, with a background. Use of the term has since become more general.

Systems with hardware sprites include arcade video games of the 1970s and 1980s; game consoles including as the Atari VCS (1977), ColecoVision (1982), Famicom (1983), Genesis/Mega Drive (1988); and home computers such as the TI-99/4 (1979), Atari 8-bit computers (1979), Commodore 64 (1982), MSX (1983), Amiga (1985), and X68000 (1987). Hardware varies in the number of sprites supported, the size and colors of each sprite, and special effects such as scaling or reporting pixel-precise overlap.

Hardware composition of sprites occurs as each scan line is prepared for the video output device, such as a cathode-ray tube, without involvement of the main CPU and without the need for a full-screen frame buffer. Sprites can be positioned or altered by setting attributes used during the hardware composition process. The number of sprites which can be displayed per scan line is often lower than the total number of sprites a system supports. For example, the Texas Instruments TMS9918 chip supports 32 sprites, but only four can appear on the same scan line.

The CPUs in modern computers, video game consoles, and mobile devices are fast enough that bitmaps can be drawn into a frame buffer without special hardware assistance. Beyond that, GPUs can render vast numbers of scaled, rotated, anti-aliased, partially translucent, very high resolution images in parallel with the CPU.

== Etymology ==
According to Karl Guttag, one of two engineers for the 1979 Texas Instruments TMS9918 video display processor, this use of the word sprite came from David Ackley, a manager at TI. It was also used by Danny Hillis at Texas Instruments in the late 1970s. The term was derived from the fact that sprites "float" on top of the background image without overwriting it, much like a ghost or mythological sprite.

Some hardware manufacturers used different terms, especially before sprite became common:

Player/Missile Graphics was a term used by Atari, Inc. for hardware sprites in the Atari 8-bit computers (1979) and Atari 5200 console (1982). The term reflects the use for both characters ("players") and smaller associated objects ("missiles") that share the same color. The earlier Atari Video Computer System and some Atari arcade games used player, missile, and ball.

Stamp was used in some arcade hardware in the early 1980s, including Ms. Pac-Man.

Movable Object Block, or MOB, was used in MOS Technology's graphics chip literature. Commodore, the main user of MOS chips and the owner of MOS for most of the chip maker's lifetime, instead used the term sprite for the Commodore 64.

OBJs (short for objects) is used in the developer manuals for the NES, Super NES, and Game Boy. The region of video RAM used to store sprite attributes and coordinates is called OAM (Object Attribute Memory). This also applies to the Game Boy Advance and Nintendo DS.

== History ==
=== Arcade video games ===
The use of sprites originated with arcade video games. Nolan Bushnell came up with the original concept when he developed the first arcade video game, Computer Space (1971). Technical limitations made it difficult to adapt the early mainframe game Spacewar! (1962), which performed an entire screen refresh for every little movement, so he came up with a solution to the problem: controlling each individual game element with a dedicated transistor. The rockets were essentially hardwired bitmaps that moved around the screen independently of the background, an important innovation for producing screen images more efficiently and providing the basis for sprite graphics.

The earliest video games to represent player characters as human player sprites were arcade sports video games, beginning with Taito's TV Basketball, released in April 1974 and licensed to Midway Manufacturing for release in North America. Designed by Tomohiro Nishikado, he wanted to move beyond simple Pong-style rectangles to character graphics, by rearranging the rectangle shapes into objects that look like basketball players and basketball hoops. Ramtek released another sports video game in October 1974, Baseball, which similarly displayed human-like characters.

The Namco Galaxian arcade system board, for the 1979 arcade game Galaxian, displays animated, multi-colored sprites over a scrolling background. It became the basis for Nintendo's Radar Scope and Donkey Kong arcade hardware and home consoles such as the Nintendo Entertainment System. According to Steve Golson from General Computer Corporation, the term "stamp" was used instead of "sprite" at the time.

=== Home systems ===
Signetics devised the first chips capable of generating sprite graphics (referred to as objects by Signetics) for home systems. The Signetics 2636 video processors were first used in the 1978 1292 Advanced Programmable Video System and later in the 1979 Elektor TV Games Computer.

The Atari VCS, released in 1977, has a hardware sprite implementation where five graphical objects can be moved independently of the game playfield. The term sprite was not in use at the time. The VCS's sprites are called movable objects in the programming manual, further identified as two players, two missiles, and one ball. These each consist of a single row of pixels that are displayed on a scan line. To produce a two-dimensional shape, the sprite's single-row bitmap is altered by software from one scan line to the next.

The 1979 Atari 400 and 800 home computers have similar, but more elaborate, circuitry capable of moving eight single-color objects per scan line: four 8-bit wide players and four 2-bit wide missiles. Each is the full height of the display—a long, thin strip. DMA from a table in memory automatically sets the graphics pattern registers for each scan line. Hardware registers control the horizontal position of each player and missile. Vertical motion is achieved by moving the bitmap data within a player or missile's strip. The feature was called player/missile graphics by Atari.

Texas Instruments developed the TMS9918 chip with sprite support for its 1979 TI-99/4 home computer. An updated version is used in the 1981 TI-99/4A.

=== In 2.5D and 3D games ===
Player interactions with sprites in a 2.5D game

Sprites remained popular with the rise of 2.5D games (those which recreate a 3D game space from a 2D map) in the late 1980s and early 1990s. A technique called billboarding allows 2.5D games to keep onscreen sprites rotated toward the player view at all times. Some 2.5D games, such as 1993's Doom, allow the same entity to be represented by different sprites depending on its rotation relative to the viewer, furthering the illusion of 3D.

Fully 3D games usually present world objects as 3D models, but sprites are supported in some 3D game engines, such as GoldSrc and Unreal, and may be billboarded or locked to fixed orientations. Sprites remain useful for small details, particle effects, and other applications where the lack of a third dimension is not a major detriment.

== Systems with hardware sprites ==
These are base hardware specs and do not include additional programming techniques, such as using raster interrupts to repurpose sprites mid-frame.

System	Sprite hardware	Introduced	Sprites on screen	Sprites per scan line	Max. texels on line	Texture width	Texture height	Colors	Zoom	Rotation	Collision detection	Transparency	Ref.
Amstrad Plus	ASIC	1990	16	16	?	16	16	15	2, 4× vertical, 2, 4× horizontal	No	No	Color key	
Atari 2600	TIA	1977	5	5	19	1, 8	262	1	2, 4, 8× horizontal	Horizontal mirroring	Yes	Color key	
Atari 8-bit computers	GTIA/ANTIC	1979	8	8	40	2, 8	128, 256	1	2× vertical, 2, 4× horizontal	No	Yes	Color key	
Commodore 64	VIC-II	1982	8	8	96, 192	12, 24	21	1, 3	2× integer	No	Yes	Color key	
Amiga (OCS)	Denise	1985	8, can be reused horizontally per 4 pixel increments	Arbitrary, 8 unique	Arbitrary	16	Arbitrary	3, 15	Vertical by display list	No	Yes	Color key	
Amiga (AGA)	Lisa	1992	8, can be reused horizontally per 2 pixel increments	Arbitrary, 8 unique	Arbitrary	16, 32, 64	Arbitrary	3, 15	Vertical by display list	No	Yes	Color key	
ColecoVision	TMS9918A	1983	32	4	64	8, 16	8, 16	1	2× integer	No	Partial	Color key	
TI-99/4 & 4A	TMS9918	1979	32	4	64	8, 16	8, 16	1	2× integer	No	Partial	Color key	
Gameduino		2011	256	96	1,536	16	16	255	No	Yes	Yes	Color key	
Intellivision	STIC AY-3-8900	1979	8	8	64	8	8,16	1	2, 4, 8× vertical, 2× horizontal	Horizontal and vertical mirroring	Yes	Color key	
MSX	TMS9918A	1983	32	4	64	8, 16	8, 16	1	2× integer	No	Partial	Color key	
MSX2	Yamaha V9938	1986	32	8	128	8, 16	8,16	1, 3, 7, 15 per line	2× integer	No	Partial	Color key	
MSX2+ / MSX turbo R	Yamaha V9958	1988	32	8	128	8,16	8,16	1, 3, 7, 15 per line	2× integer	No	Partial	Color key	
Namco Pac-Man (arcade)	TTL	1980	6	6	96	16	16	3	No	Horizontal and vertical mirroring	No	Color key	
TurboGrafx-16	HuC6270A	1987	64	16	256	16, 32	16, 32, 64	15	No	Horizontal and vertical mirroring	Yes	Color key	
Namco Galaxian (arcade)	TTL	1979	7	7	112	16	16	3	No	Horizontal and vertical mirroring	No	Color key	
Nintendo Donkey Kong, Radar Scope (arcade)		1979	128	16	256	16	16	3	Integer	No	Yes	Color key	
Nintendo DS	Integrated PPU	2004	128	128	1,210	8, 16, 32, 64	8, 16, 32, 64	65,536	Affine	Affine	No	Color key, blending	
NES/Famicom	Ricoh RP2C0x PPU	1983	64	8	64	8	8, 16	3	No	Horizontal and vertical mirroring	Partial	Color key	
Game Boy	Integrated PPU	1989	40	10	80	8	8, 16	3	No	Horizontal and vertical mirroring	No	Color key	
Game Boy Advance	Integrated PPU	2001	128	128	1210	8, 16, 32, 64	8, 16, 32, 64	15, 255	Affine	Affine	No	Color key, blending	
Master System, Game Gear	YM2602B VDP (TMS9918-derived)	1985	64	8	128	8, 16	8, 16	15	2× integer, 2× vertical	Background tile mirroring	Yes	Color key	
Genesis / Mega Drive	YM7101 VDP (SMS VDP-derived)	1988	80	20	320	8, 16, 24, 32	8, 16, 24, 32	15	No	Horizontal and vertical mirroring	Yes	Color key	
Sega OutRun (arcade)		1986	128	128	1600	8 to 512	8 to 256	15	Anisotropic	Horizontal and vertical mirroring	Yes	Alpha	
X68000	Cynthia jr. (original), Cynthia (later models)	1987	128	32	512	16	16	15	2× integer	Horizontal and vertical mirroring	Partial	Color key	
Neo Geo	LSPC2-A2	1990	384	96	1536	16	16 to 512	15	Sprite shrinking	Horizontal and vertical mirroring	Partial	Color key	
Super NES / Super Famicom	S-PPU1, S-PPU2	1990	128	34	256	8, 16, 32, 64	8, 16, 32, 64	15	No	Horizontal and vertical mirroring	No	Color key, averaging	
System	Sprite hardware	Introduced	Sprites on screen	Sprites on line	Max. texels on line	Texture width	Texture height	Colors	Hardware zoom	Rotation	Collision detection	Transparency	Source

== See also ==
- 2.5D
