= Brian P. Dougherty =

Software engineer

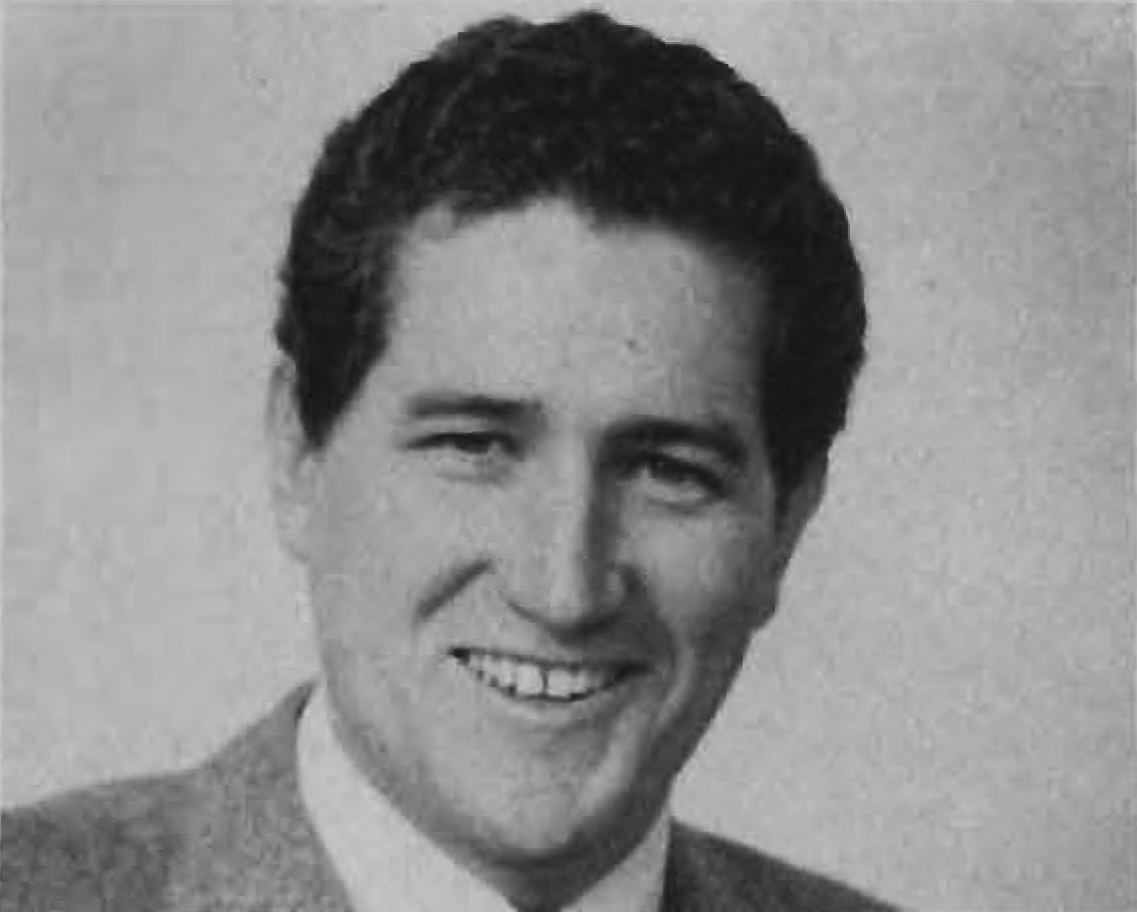
- Dougherty in 1987, age 31
- Born: Brian P. Dougherty; 1956 (age 69–70); Berkeley, California, United States
- Education: University of California, Berkeley
- Occupations: Businessman; programmer
- Years active: 1981–present
- Known for: Founder and CEO of Berkeley Softworks (later renamed to GeoWorks Corporation); co-founder of Imagic, GlobalPC, and Wink Communications

Brian P. Dougherty (born 1956) is an American software developer and businessman best known as the founder and CEO of Berkeley Softworks (later GeoWorks Corporation), which produced the pioneering GEOS graphical operating system for the Commodore 64 in 1986 and the influential PC/GEOS operating system for the IBM PCs and compatibles in 1990. Dougherty also founded GlobalPC, Airset and Wink Communications. While Dougherty was CEO of GeoWorks, he had been approached by several large technology companies including Microsoft and Apple because of the success of the GEOS operating system. Dougherty attended the University of California, Berkeley, where he graduated with a B.S. in electrical engineering and computer science. When he graduated he began working at Mattel, where he contributed for the design of the Intellivision video game system.

== Career ==
=== Early career ===
Dougherty started his career in making video games in 1979 with the help of Mattel for their then newly released Intellivision home video game console.

After two years of developing video games for the Intellivision, in 1981 Dougherty co-founded Imagic, a private video game developer and publisher which made games for the Atari 2600, the Intellivision's direct competitor. Alongside Dave Durran, which would go on to be the Vice President and Software Architect at GeoWorks, would go on to publish games for consoles and home computers such as the TRS-80 Color Computer and the IBM PCjr. Following the video game crash of 1983, Imagic filed for bankruptcy. After its downfall, the rights to its most popular releases were bought by Activision in the mid-1980s.

=== Berkeley Softworks and GEOS ===
Logo of Berkeley Softworks (1983–1990)

In 1983, Dougherty founded Berkeley Softworks (originally incorporated as the Softworks) in Berkeley, California, as a means of publishing his own software independently. His first long-time success was a simple graphical user interface for the Commodore 64, 128, Plus/4, and Apple II, dubbed GEOS. The GEOS 8-bit version of GEOS, released in March 1986, took advantage of pointing devices such as Commodore's 1351 mouse or joystick. GEOS also included pre-installed software useful for desktop publishing or education: geoWrite, a text-editing and word processor application; geoDraw, a simple drawing program; geoPublish, a desktop publishing program made for producing multi-page documents such as newsletters; geoBASIC, the BASIC programming language with added extensions for graphic design; geoNET, a low-cost local area networking application used for educational environments that works with the C64 and C128 and allows Apple IIe computers to be networked with each other or with an IBM PC (allowing it to be used as a printing or file server); geoCalc, spreadsheet program for offices; geoProgrammer, a machine language development tool which provides programmers with an assembler, linker and debugger and reads directly from geoWrite files; and geoFile, a data-filling application in which information is organized and stored in forms. GeoPublish was first ported to the C64, 64c and the C128 in 1986 2 years later it was ported to the Apple II. Version 2.0 of the software was officially released to consumers in 1993 along with the rebranding to PC/GEOS.

Berkeley Softworks also produced a memory expansion peripheral for the C64 and C128 that was optimized to work with GEOS itself. Named geoRAM, it was created by the co-founder of Imagic Dave Durran, it was a 512k expansion unit that could upgrade a C64 to 576K of memory or a C128 to 640k. Commodore International stopped making memory expansions for their computers during the 1980's because of the chip shortages. GEOS could make clever use of the memory on the C64 and C128, treating 1764 as 1541 for the 64 and 1750 as 1571 for the 128; a RAM expansion unit could make memory-intensive programs such as geoDraw perform smoother however they were expensive at the time. GeoRAM sought to solve this problem by being affordable ($125, $294.37 today), fast and efficient by using CMOS technology. GeoRAM's power consumption was kept at an average of only 80 milliamperes. Even though geoRAM would give GEOS all of the advantages which comes with a 1750 it wasn't compatible with it. A special version of GEOS 2.0 was bundled alongside geoRAM and it was necessary to use the expansion. Compute's! Gazette claimed that access through geoRAM was 35 times faster than the standard amount of time that a normal disc would take to access GEOS.

At its peak, GEOS was considered the second most widely used consumer OS just behind Mac OS and the third most popular OS by units shipped behind the former and MS-DOS. Berkeley Softworks used to do a telecommunications service on the commodore-exclusive Quantum Link (Q-Link). Dougherty said in an interview with Gazette that "We really prefer to handle customer service problems through Q-Link. At the price we sell our software we really can't afford to have 20 or 50 people in customer service answering the phones". In the first year of release, GEOS was estimated to have sold 450,000 units, and Dougherty expected that over half a million commodore computers would run GEOS. With the help of Berkeley Softworks's interface-converter called geoCable allowed GEOS to work with multiple different types of printers such as the Apple LaserWriter. The ability to print to high-end printers allowed GEOS to have a head start in the desktop publishing platform.

=== PC/GEOS and GeoWorks ===
After the success of GEOS, Dougherty renamed his company to GeoWorks Corporation and started development on a version of GEOS for IBM PC compatibles. PC/GEOS originally ran on top of MS-DOS with the GeoWorks desktop software running on top of it. PC/GEOS won the 1991 award for the best consumer software from the Software Publishers Association.

At the beginning of the 1990s, Dougherty and his team were all approached by Microsoft's then-CEO Bill Gates to discuss acquiring some of GeoWork's patents into Windows, such as the concept behind the Start menu, which PC/GEOS had years before Windows did. Bill also wanted to move the development team from Berkeley to Seattle. GeoWorks were not interested, and their lead venture capitalist advised against this idea. Dougherty would later go on to describe Gates as being charming and Steve Ballmer as being the "bad cop". He defended Microsoft's business practices and insisted that they "fought tooth to nail to defend their business".

Around the same time, GeoWorks had extensive discussions with Apple about developing a low-cost notebook computer which ran a modified version of PC/GEOS but with a Mac OS-styled UI. Talks between GeoWorks and Apple progressed to the point that Apple's then-CEO John Sculley was presented a pitch, although it was ultimately scrapped in favor of manufacturing and designing PowerBooks, which ran Mac OS.

Dougherty accused the Java development team at Sun Microsystems for studying PC/GEOS and stealing some of its concepts to implement into Solaris. He claimed that GeoWorks's object-oriented operating environment has one of the most sophisticated UI technology to ever be implemented into an OS.

=== After GEOS ===
Before retiring from GeoWorks in the mid-1990s, Dougherty sold the rights to PC/GEOS to NewDeal Inc., who rebranded successive versions of the operating system as NewDeal Office (NDO). In 1995, Dougherty founded Wink Communications, serving as chairman and CTO of the company. Wink Communications is considered a pioneer in interactive television but would later on go to be sold to Liberty Media in 2002 for $100 million. The company provided end-to-end systems for low cost electronics commerce on television. NewDeal Office meanwhile was marketed in the late 1990s to those who owned obsolete i386- and i486-based computers not powerful enough to run Windows 95 or Windows 98. Development on NDO ended in 2000 after NewDeal went bankrupt.

In 1998, Dougherty and Nintendo of America alumnus Mark Bradlee founded GlobalPC Inc., a start-up manufacturer of Internet appliances. GlobalPC would later on have substantially all of its assets and assumed certain liabilities bought by MyTurn.com, Inc. The assets acquired by MyTurn would were being utilized to manufacture, distribute and sell the GlobalPC, an Internet appliance and easy-to-use computer intended for first-time users which was designed to be hooked up to a television for use. Two commercials for the GlobalPC were made, one being a spoof on Apple's "1984" Super Bowl commercial. The spoof won the 2001 Association of Imaging Technology and Soun International Monitor's award for best achievement and editing, with the second commercial featuring former CNN anchor Terry Bradshaw and Bella Shaw in which they show the features of the GlobalPC. The GlobalPC was pre-installed with a modified version of PC/GEOS, which was marketed as being much more simplistic than Windows and used a i486 processor. It sold primarily through mass merchant retailers at a price of US$299 with retailers such as Walmart and K-mart agreeing to sell it.

After leaving MyTurn in 2003, Dougherty founded Airena Inc., later known as Airset Inc. the same year. Airset was a private software development and cloud computing company based in Berkeley. The cloud computing software and hardware the company developed allowed individual cloud computers to get connected to a cloud network. Every cloud computer had an expandable hard drive, multiple web applications and acts as a web server publishing client with the service being free.
