= Mobile operating system =

Operating system that operates a mobile device

A mobile operating system is an operating system used for smartphones, tablets, smartwatches, smartglasses, or other non-laptop personal mobile computing devices. While computers such as laptops are "mobile", the operating systems used on them are usually not considered mobile, as they were originally designed for desktop computers that historically did not have or need specific mobile features. This "fine line" distinguishing mobile and other forms has become blurred in recent years, due to the fact that newer devices have become smaller and more mobile, unlike the hardware of the past. Key factors blurring this line are the introduction of tablet computers, light laptops, and the hybridization of the 2-in-1 PCs.

Mobile operating systems combine features of a desktop computer operating system with other features useful for mobile or handheld use, and usually including a wireless built-in modem and SIM tray for telephone and data connection. In 2024, approximately 1.22 billion smartphones were sold globally, marking a 7% increase over the previous year and a solid rebound after two consecutive years of declines. Sales in 2012 were 1.56 billion; sales in 2023 were 1.43 billion with 53.32% being Android. Android alone has more sales than the popular desktop operating system Microsoft Windows, and smartphone use (even without tablets) outnumbers desktop use.

Mobile devices, with mobile communications abilities (for example, smartphones), contain two mobile operating systems. The main user-facing software platform is supplemented by a second low-level proprietary real-time operating system which operates the radio and other hardware. Research has shown that these low-level systems may contain a range of security vulnerabilities permitting malicious base stations to gain high levels of control over the mobile device.

Mobile operating systems have had the most use of any operating system since 2017 (measured by web use).

== Timeline ==
Mobile operating system milestones mirror the development of mobile phones, PDAs, and smartphones:

=== Pre-1990 ===
- 1990–2010 – Mobile phones use embedded systems to control operation.

=== 1993–1999 ===
- 1993
  - April – PenPoint OS by GO Corp. become available on the AT&T EO Personal Communicator.
  - August – Apple launches Newton OS running on their Newton series of portable computers.
- 1994
  - March – Magic Cap OS by General Magic is first introduced on the Sony Magic Link PDA.
  - August – The first smartphone, the IBM Simon, has a touchscreen, email, and PDA features.
- 1996
  - March – The Palm Pilot 1000 personal digital assistant is introduced with the Palm OS mobile operating system.
  - August – Nokia releases the Nokia 9000 Communicator running an integrated system based on the PEN/GEOS 3.0 OS from Geoworks.
- 1997 – EPOC32 first appears on the Psion Series 5 PDA. Release 6 of EPOC32 will later be renamed to Symbian OS.
- 1998 – Symbian Ltd. is formed as a joint venture by Psion, Ericsson, Motorola, and Nokia, Psion's EPOC32 OS becomes Symbian's EPOC operating system, and is later renamed to Symbian OS. Symbian's OS was used by those companies and several other major mobile phone brands, but especially Nokia.
- 1999
  - June – Qualcomm's pdQ becomes the first smartphone with Palm OS.
  - October – Nokia S40 Platform is officially introduced along with the Nokia 7110, the first phone with T9 predictive text input and a Wireless Application Protocol (WAP) browser for accessing specially formatted Internet data.

=== 2000s ===
- 2000 – The Ericsson R380 is released with EPOC32 Release 5, marking the first use on a phone of what's to become known as Symbian OS (as of Release 6).
- 2001
  - June – Nokia's Symbian Series 80 platform is first released on the Nokia 9210 Communicator This is the first phone running an OS branded as Symbian, and the first phone using that OS that allows user installation of additional software.
  - September – Qualcomm's Binary Runtime Environment for Wireless (BREW) platform on their REX real-time operating system (RTOS) is first released on the Kyocera QCP-3035.
- 2002
  - March
    - BlackBerry releases its first smartphone, running Java 2 Micro Edition (J2ME).
    - UIQ is first released, at v2.0, on Symbian OS, and becomes available later in the year on the Sony Ericsson P800, the successor to the Ericsson R380.
  - June
    - Microsoft's first Windows CE (Pocket PC) smartphones are introduced.
    - Nokia's Symbian Series 60 (S60) platform is released with the Nokia 7650, Nokia's first phone with a camera and Multimedia Messaging Service (MMS). S60 would form the basis of the OS on most of Nokia's smartphones until 2011, when they adopted Microsoft's Windows Phone 7. S60 was also used on some phones from Samsung and others, and later by Sony Ericsson after the consolidation of some Symbian UI variants in 2008.
  - October – The Danger Hiptop (T-Mobile Sidekick in U.S.) is first released by Danger, Inc., running DangerOS.
- 2003 – Motorola introduces first Linux-based cellphone Motorola A760 base on Linux MontaVista distribution.
- 2005
  - May – Microsoft announces Windows Mobile 5.0.
  - November – Nokia introduces Maemo OS on the first, small Internet tablet, the N770, with a 4.13" screen.
- 2006
  - November – FIC announces Linux-based OpenMoko platform along with its first smartphone, Neo1973, at the Open Source in Mobile conference in Amsterdam.
- 2007
  - January – Apple's iPhone with iOS (named "iPhone OS" for its first three releases) is introduced as a "widescreen iPod", "mobile phone", and "Internet communicator".
  - February – Microsoft announces Windows Mobile 6.0.
  - May – Palm announces the Palm Foleo, a "Mobile Companion" device similar to a subnotebook computer, running a modified Linux kernel and relying on a companion Palm Treo smartphone to send and retrieve mail, as well as provide data connectivity when away from WiFi. Palm canceled Foleo development on September 4, 2007, after facing public criticism.
  - June – World's very first iPhone is released in the United States.
  - July – OpenMoko's first smartphone - Neo1973 - is released, primarily targeting developers.
  - November – Open Handset Alliance (OHA) is established, led by Google with 34 members (HTC, Sony, Dell, Intel, Motorola, Samsung, LG, etc.)
- 2008
  - February – LiMo Foundation announces the first phones running the LiMo mobile Linux distribution, from Motorola, NEC, Panasonic Mobile, and Samsung, released later in the year. The LiMo Foundation later became the Tizen Association and LiMo was subsumed by Tizen.
  - June – Nokia becomes the sole owner of Symbian Ltd. The Symbian Foundation was then formed to co-ordinate the future development of the Symbian platform among the corporations using it, in a manner similar to the Open Handset Alliance with Android. Nokia remained the major contributor to Symbian's code.
  - July
    - OpenMoko releases its second device - the Neo FreeRunner smartphone.
    - Apple releases iPhone OS 2 with the iPhone 3G, making available Apple's App Store.
  - October – OHA releases Android 1.0 (based on Linux kernel) with the HTC Dream (T-Mobile G1) as the first Android phone.
  - November – Symbian^1, the Symbian Foundation's touch-specific S60-based platform (equivalent to S60 5th edition) is first released on Nokia's first touchscreen Symbian phone, the Nokia 5800 XpressMusic, with a resistive screen and a stylus. Symbian^1 being derived from S60 meant that support for UIQ disappeared and no further devices using UIQ were released.
- 2009
  - January
    - Intel announces Moblin 2, specifically created for netbooks that run the company's Atom processor. In April 2009 Intel turned Moblin over to the Linux Foundation.
    - Palm introduces webOS with the Palm Pre (released in June). The new OS is not backward-compatible with their previous Palm OS.
  - February
    - Palm announces that no further devices with Palm OS are going to be released by the company. (The last was the Palm Centro, released October 14, 2007.)
    - Microsoft announces Windows Mobile 6.5, an "unwanted stopgap" update to Windows Mobile 6.1 intended to bridge the gap between version 6.1 and the then yet-to-be released Windows Mobile 7 (later canceled in favor of Windows Phone 7). The first devices running it appeared in late October 2009.
  - May – DangerOS 5.0 becomes available, based on NetBSD.
  - June – Apple releases iPhone OS 3 with the iPhone 3GS.
  - November – Nokia releases the Nokia N900, its first and only smartphone running the Maemo OS intended for "handheld computers...with voice capability", while stating that they remain focused on Symbian S60 as their smartphone OS. (Nokia had previously released three Mobile Internet devices running Maemo, without cellular network connectivity.)

=== 2010s ===
==== 2010 ====
- February
  - MeeGo is announced, a mobile Linux distribution merging Maemo from Nokia and Moblin from Intel and Linux Foundation, to be hosted by Linux Foundation. MeeGo is not backward-compatible with any previous operating system.
  - Samsung introduces the Bada OS and shows the first Bada smartphone, the Samsung S8500. It was later released in May 2010.
- April
  - Apple releases the iPad (first generation) with iPhone OS 3.2. This is the first version of the OS to support tablet computers. For its next major version (4.0) iPhone OS will be renamed iOS.
  - HP acquires Palm in order to use webOS in multiple new products, including smartphones, tablets, and printers, later stating their intent to use it as the universal platform for all their devices.
- May – Microsoft Kin phone line with KIN OS (based on Windows CE and a "close cousin" to Windows Phone) become available.
- June – Apple releases iOS 4, renamed from iPhone OS, with the iPhone 4.
- July – Microsoft Kin phones and KIN OS are discontinued.
- September
  - Apple releases a variant of iOS powering the new 2nd generation Apple TV.
  - Symbian^3 is first released on the Nokia N8. This would be Nokia's last flagship device running Symbian (though not their last Symbian phone), before switching to Windows Phone 7 for future flagship phones.
  - The Danger Hiptop line and DangerOS are discontinued as a result of Microsoft's acquisition of Danger, Inc. in 2008.
- November
  - Nokia assumes full control over Symbian as the Symbian Foundation disintegrates.
  - Windows Phone OS is released on Windows Phone 7 phones by HTC, LG, Samsung, and Dell. The new OS is not backward-compatible with the prior Windows Mobile OS.

==== 2011 ====
- February
  - Android 3.0 (Honeycomb), the first version to officially support tablet computers, is released on the Motorola Xoom.
  - Nokia abandons the Symbian OS and announces that it would use Microsoft's Windows Phone 7 as its primary smartphone platform, while Symbian would be gradually wound down.
- April – BlackBerry Tablet OS, based on QNX Neutrino is released on the BlackBerry PlayBook.
- July
  - Mozilla announces their Boot to Gecko project (later named Firefox OS) to develop an OS for handheld devices emphasizing standards-based Web technologies, similar to webOS.
  - webOS 3.0, the first version to support tablet computers, is released on the HP TouchPad.
- August – HP announces that webOS device development and production lines would be halted. The last HP webOS version, 3.0.5, is released on January 12, 2012.
- September
  - MeeGo is introduced with the limited-release Nokia N9, Nokia's first and only consumer device to use the OS. (A small number of the Nokia N950, a MeeGo phone available only to developers, were released in mid-2011.)
  - After Nokia's abandonment of MeeGo, Intel and the Linux Foundation announce a partnership with Samsung to launch Tizen, shifting their focus from MeeGo (Intel and Linux Foundation) and Bada (Samsung) during 2011 and 2012.
- October
  - Apple releases iOS 5 with the iPhone 4S, integrating the Siri voice assistant.
  - The Mer project is announced, based on an ultra-portable core for building products, composed of Linux, HTML5, QML, and JavaScript, which is derived from the MeeGo codebase.
- November – Fire OS, a fork of the Android operating system, is released by Amazon.com on the Kindle Fire tablet.

==== 2012 ====
- May – Nokia releases the Nokia 808 PureView, later confirmed (in January 2013) to be the last Symbian smartphone. This phone was followed by a single last Symbian software update, "Nokia Belle, Feature Pack 2", later in 2012.
- July
  - Finnish start-up Jolla, formed by former Nokia employees, announces that MeeGo's community-driven successor Mer would be the basis of their new Sailfish smartphone OS.
  - Mozilla announces that the project formerly named Boot to Gecko (which is built atop an Android Linux kernel using Android drivers and services; however it uses no Java-like code of Android) is now Firefox OS (since discontinued) and has several handset OEMs on board.
- August – Samsung announces they will not ship further phones using their Bada OS, instead focusing on Windows Phone 8 and Android.
- September – Apple releases iOS 6 with the iPhone 5.

==== 2013 ====
- January – BlackBerry releases their new operating system for smartphones, BlackBerry 10, with their Q10 and Z10 smartphones. BlackBerry 10 is not backward-compatible with the BlackBerry OS used on their previous smartphones.
- February – HP sells webOS to LG.
- September – Apple releases iOS 7 with the iPhone 5S and iPhone 5C.
- October
  - Canonical announces Ubuntu Touch, a version of the Linux distribution expressly designed for smartphones. The OS is built on the Android Linux kernel, using Android drivers and services, but does not use any of the Java-like code of Android.
  - Google releases Android KitKat 4.4.
- November – Jolla releases Sailfish OS on the Jolla smartphone.

==== 2014 ====
- February
  - Microsoft releases Windows Phone 8.1
  - Nokia introduces their Nokia X platform OS as an Android 4.1.2 Jelly Bean fork on the Nokia X family of smartphones. Similar to Amazon.com's Fire OS, it replaces Google's apps and services with ones from Nokia (such as HERE Maps, Nokia Xpress and MixRadio, and Nokia's own app store) and Microsoft (such as Skype and Outlook), with a user interface that mimics the Windows Phone UI. After the acquisition of Nokia's devices unit, Microsoft announced in July 2014 that no more Nokia X smartphones would be introduced, marking the end of the platform just a few months later.
- August – The Samsung SM-Z9005 Z is the first phone released running Tizen, with v2.2.1 of the OS.
- September
  - Apple releases iOS 8 with the iPhone 6 and 6 Plus.
  - BlackBerry releases BlackBerry 10 version 10.3 with integration with the Amazon Appstore
- November – Google releases Android 5.0 "Lollipop"

==== 2015 ====
- February – Google releases Android 5.1 "Lollipop".
- April
  - LG releases the LG Watch Urbane LTE smartwatch running "LG Wearable Platform OS" based on webOS. This is a version of their Android Wear OS-based LG Watch Urbane, with added LTE connectivity.
  - watchOS, based on iOS, is released by Apple with the Apple Watch.
- September
  - Apple releases iOS 9 with the iPhone 6S and 6S Plus, iPad Pro, and iPad Mini 4, plus watchOS 2. tvOS 9 is also made distinct from iOS, with its own App Store, launching with Apple TV 4th generation.
  - Google releases Android 6.0 "Marshmallow".
- October – BlackBerry announces that there are no plans to release new APIs and software development kits for BlackBerry 10, and future updates would focus on security and privacy enhancements only.
- November – Microsoft releases Windows 10 Mobile.

==== 2016 ====
- February – Microsoft releases the Lumia 650, their last Windows 10 Mobile phone before discontinuing all mobile hardware production the following year.
- July – The BlackBerry Classic, the last device to date running a BlackBerry OS is discontinued. While BlackBerry Limited claimed to still be committed to the BlackBerry 10 operating system, they have since only shipped Android devices after releasing the BlackBerry Priv, their first Android smartphone in November 2015.
- August
  - Google posts the Fuchsia source code on GitHub.
  - Google releases Android 7.0 "Nougat".
- September – Apple releases iOS 10 with the iPhone 7 and 7 Plus, and watchOS 3 with the Apple Watch Series 1 and 2.
- November
  - Tizen releases Tizen 3.0.
  - BlackBerry releases BlackBerry 10 version 10.3.3.

==== 2017 ====
- April
  - Development of Ubuntu Touch is transferred from Canonical Ltd. to the UBports Foundation
  - Samsung officially launches Android-based Samsung Experience custom firmware starting with version 8.1 on Samsung Galaxy S8.
- May
  - Samsung announces Tizen 4.0 at Tizen Developer Conference 2017.
- August
  - Google releases Android 8.0 "Oreo".
- September
  - Apple releases iOS 11 with the iPhone 8 and 8 Plus and iPhone X, and watchOS 4 with the Apple Watch Series 3.
- October
  - Microsoft announces that Windows 10 Mobile development is going into maintenance mode only, ending the release of any new features or functionality due to lack of market penetration and resultant lack of interest from app developers, and releases the final major update to it, the "Fall Creators Update."
  - Cherry Mobile release Cherry OS based on Android

==== 2018 ====
- February
  - Samsung releases Samsung Experience 9.0 based on Android "Oreo" 8.0 globally to Samsung Galaxy S8 and S8+.
- March
  - Google and partners officially launches Android Go (based on Android "Oreo" 8.1 but tailored for low-end devices) with Nokia 1, Alcatel 1X, ZTE Tempo Go, General Mobile 8 Go, Micromax Bharat Go and Lava Z50.
  - Google releases Android "9" as a developer preview.
- April
  - Microsoft release Windows 10 Version 1803 "April 2018 Update".
- May
  - Huawei release LiteOS version 2.1.
- August
  - Google releases Android 9.0 "Pie".
  - UBPorts released Ubuntu Touch OTA-14, upgrading the OS based on the Canonical's long-term support version of Ubuntu 16.04 LTS "Xenial Xerus".
  - Xiaomi officially introduces MIUI for POCO for their Poco series smartphone.
  - Samsung officially introduces Tizen 4.0 with the release of Samsung Galaxy Watch series.
- September
  - Apple releases iOS 12 with the iPhone XS and XS Max, and watchOS 5 with Apple Watch Series 4.
  - Huawei releases EMUI 9.0.
- October
  - Microsoft releases Windows 10 Version 1809 "October 2018 Update".
- November
  - Samsung announces the One UI as the latest version of the Samsung Experience UI.
  - Amazon released Fire OS 6 to supported Fire HD devices.

==== 2019 ====
- January
  - Microsoft announces that support for Windows 10 Mobile would end on December 10, 2019, and that Windows 10 Mobile users should migrate to iOS or Android phones.
- June
  - Apple announces iOS 13, watchOS 6, and iPadOS as a distinct variant of iOS.
- August
  - Huawei officially announces HarmonyOS
- September
  - Apple releases iOS 13 with the iPhone 11 series, watchOS 6 with Apple Watch Series 5, and iPadOS with the 7th generation iPad.
  - Google releases Android 10.
  - The Librem 5, the first phone running PureOS, is released.
- October
  - Samsung announces the One UI 2.0 as the latest version of their Galaxy Smartphone and Smartwatch UI .
- November
  - Microsoft releases the Windows 10 November 10, 2019 Update.

== Current software platforms ==
These operating systems often run atop baseband or other real-time operating systems that handle hardware aspects of the phone.

=== Android ===
Android (based on the modified Linux kernel) is a mobile operating system developed by Open Handset Alliance. The base system is open-source (and only the kernel copyleft), but the apps and drivers which provide functionality are increasingly becoming closed-source. Besides having the largest installed base worldwide on smartphones, it is also the most popular operating system for general purpose computers (a category that includes desktop computers and mobile devices), even though Android is not a popular operating system for regular (desktop) personal computers (PCs). Although the Android operating system is free and open-source software, in devices sold, much of the software bundled with it (including Google apps and vendor-installed software) is proprietary software and closed-source.

Android's releases before 2.0 (1.0, 1.5, 1.6) were used exclusively on mobile phones. Android 2.x releases were mostly used for mobile phones but also some tablets. Android 3.0 was a tablet-oriented release and does not officially run on mobile phones. Both phone and tablet compatibility were merged with Android 4.0.

Many OEMs ship their devices with custom skins and numerous forks of Android are available to use as custom ROMs.

=== Wear OS ===
Wear OS (also known simply as Wear and formerly Android Wear) is a version of Google's Android operating system designed for smartwatches and other wearables. By pairing with mobile phones running Android version 6.0 or newer, or iOS version 10.0 or newer with limited support from Google's pairing application, Wear OS integrates Google Assistant technology and mobile notifications into a smartwatch form factor.

In May 2021 at Google I/O, Google announced a major update to the platform, internally known as Wear OS 3.0. It incorporates a new visual design inspired by Android 12, and Fitbit exercise tracking features. Google also announced a partnership with Samsung Electronics, who is collaborating with Google to unify its Tizen-based smartwatch platform with Wear OS, and has committed to using Wear OS on its future smartwatch products starting with One UI Watch 3.0. The underlying codebase was also upgraded to Android 11.

=== ChromeOS ===
ChromeOS is an operating system designed by Google that is based on the Linux kernel and uses the Google Chrome web browser as its principal user interface. As a result, ChromeOS primarily supports web applications. Google announced the project in July 2009, conceiving it as an operating system in which both applications and user data reside in the cloud: hence ChromeOS primarily runs web applications.

Due to increase of popularity with 2-in-1 PCs, most recent Chromebooks are introduced with touch screen capability, with Android applications starting to become available for the operating system in 2014. And in 2016, access to Android apps in the entire Google Play Store was introduced on supported ChromeOS devices. With the support of Android applications, there are Chromebook devices that are positioned as tablet based instead of notebooks.

ChromeOS is only available pre-installed on hardware from Google manufacturing partners. An open source equivalent, ChromiumOS, can be compiled from downloaded source code. Early on, Google provided design goals for ChromeOS, but has not otherwise released a technical description.

=== Sailfish OS ===
Sailfish OS is an operating system made by Jolla. It is open source with GNU General Public License (GPL) for middleware stack core which comes from MER. Sailfish, due to Jolla's business model, alliances with various partners and intentional design of OS internals, is capable to adopt in several layers of third-party software, including Jolla software e.g. Jolla's UI is proprietary software (closed source), so such components can be proprietary with many kinds of licences. However, users can replace them with open source components like NEMO UI instead Jolla's UI.

After Nokia abandoned in 2011 the MeeGo project, most of the MeeGo team left Nokia, and established Jolla as a company to use MeeGo and Mer business opportunities. The MER standard allows it to be launched on any hardware with kernel compatible with MER. In 2012, Linux Sailfish OS based on MeeGo and using middleware of MER core stack distribution was launched for public use. The first device, the Jolla smartphone, was unveiled on May 20, 2013. In 2015, Jolla Tablet was launched and the BRICS countries declared it an officially supported OS there. Jolla started licensing Sailfish OS 2.0 for third parties. Some devices sold are updateable to Sailfish 2.0 with no limits.

Nemo Mobile is a community-driven OS, similar to Sailfish but attempting to replace its proprietary components, such as the user interface.

=== SteamOS ===
SteamOS is a Linux distribution developed by Valve. It incorporates Valve's popular namesake Steam video game storefront and is the primary operating system for Steam Machines and the Steam Deck. SteamOS is open source with some closed source components.

SteamOS was originally built to support streaming of video games from one personal computer to the one running SteamOS within the same network, although the operating system can support standalone systems and was intended to be used as part of Valve's Steam Machine platform. SteamOS versions 1.0, released in December 2013, and 2.0 were based on the Debian distribution of Linux with GNOME desktop. With SteamOS, Valve encouraged developers to incorporate Linux compatibility into their releases to better support Linux gaming options.

In February 2022, Valve released the handheld gaming computer Steam Deck running SteamOS 3.0. SteamOS 3 is based on the Arch Linux distribution with KDE Plasma 5.

=== Tizen ===
Tizen (based on the Linux kernel) is a mobile operating system hosted by Linux Foundation, together with support from the Tizen Association, guided by a Technical Steering Group composed of Intel and Samsung.

Tizen is an operating system for devices including smartphones, tablets, In-Vehicle Infotainment (IVI) devices, however currently it mainly focuses on wearable and smart TVs. It is an open source system (however the SDK was closed-source and proprietary) that aims to offer a consistent user experience across devices. Tizen's main components are the Linux kernel and the WebKit runtime. According to Intel, Tizen "combines the best of LiMo and MeeGo." HTML5 apps are emphasized, with MeeGo encouraging its members to transition to Tizen, stating that the "future belongs to HTML5-based applications, outside of a relatively small percentage of apps, and we are firmly convinced that our investment needs to shift toward HTML5." Tizen will be targeted at a variety of platforms such as handsets, touch pc, smart TVs and in-vehicle entertainment. On May 17, 2013, Tizen released version 2.1, code-named Nectarine.

While Tizen itself was open source, most of the UX and UI layer that was developed by Samsung was mainly closed-source and proprietary, such as the TouchWiz UI on the Samsung Z's series smartphone and One UI for their Galaxy Watch wearable lines.

Note that some refrigerators use Tizen, even though they are not considered mobile devices.

=== KaiOS ===
KaiOS is a operational system made by KaiOS Tecnologies based on Firefox OS/Boot to Gecko. Unlike most mobile operating systems, which focus on smartphones, KaiOS was developed mainly for feature phones, giving these access to more advanced technologies usually found on smartphones, such as app stores and Wi-Fi/4G capabilities.

It is a mix of closed-source and open-source components. FirefoxOS/B2G was released under the permissive MPL 2.0. It does not redistribute itself under the same license, so KaiOS is now presumably proprietary (but still mostly open-source, publishing its source code). KaiOS is not entirely proprietary, as it uses the copyleft GPL Linux kernel also used in Android.

==== Smart Feature OS ====
Smart Feature OS is a custom version of KaiOS that was developed and solely used by HMD Global for their KaiOS line of Nokia feature phone. The main differences between stock KaiOS and Smart Feature OS is the aesthetics such as icons, widgets, a custom Nokia ringtone and notification tone.

=== Fully open-source, entirely permissive licenses ===
==== Fuchsia ====
Fuchsia is a capability-based, real-time operating system (RTOS) currently being developed by Google. It was first discovered as a mysterious code post on GitHub in August 2016, without any official announcement. In contrast to prior Google-developed operating systems such as ChromeOS and Android, which are based on Linux kernels, Fuchsia is based on a new microkernel called "Zircon", derived from "Little Kernel", a small operating system intended for embedded systems. This allows it to remove Linux and the copyleft GPL under which the Linux kernel is licensed; Fuchsia is licensed under the permissive BSD 3-clause, Apache 2.0, and MIT licenses. Upon inspection, media outlets noted that the code post on GitHub suggested Fuchsia's capability to run on universal devices, from embedded systems to smartphones, tablets and personal computers. In May 2017, Fuchsia was updated with a user interface, along with a developer writing that the project was not a for experimental, prompting media speculation about Google's intentions with the operating system, including the possibility of it replacing Android.

==== LiteOS ====
LiteOS is a discontinued lightweight open source real-time operating system which is part of Huawei's "1+2+1" Internet of Things solution, which is similar to Google Android Things and Samsung Tizen. It was released under the permissive BSD 3-clause license. LiteOS was used in the Huawei Watch GT series and their sub-brand Honor Magic Watch series.

==== OpenHarmony ====
OpenHarmony is an open-source version of HarmonyOS developed and donated by Huawei to the OpenAtom Foundation. It supports devices running a mini system with memory as small as 128 KB, or running a standard system with memory greater than 128 MB. The open source HarmonyOS is based on the Huawei LiteOS kernel and Linux kernel for standard systems. OpenHarmony LiteOS Cortex-A brings small-sized, low-power, and high-performance experience and builds a unified and open ecosystem for developers. In addition, it provides rich kernel mechanisms, more comprehensive Portable Operating System Interface (POSIX), and a unified driver framework, Hardware Driver Foundation (HDF), which offers unified access for device developers and friendly development experience for application developers.

=== Fully open-source, mixed copyleft and permissive licenses ===
==== Fedora Mobility ====
Fedora Mobility is under developing mobile operating system by the Fedora Project that are porting Fedora to run on portable devices such as phones and tablets.

==== LuneOS ====
LuneOS is a modern reimplementation of the Palm/HP webOS interface.

==== Manjaro ARM ====
Manjaro ARM is a mobile operating system with Plasma Mobile desktop environment that is running and default operating system on the PinePhone, an ARM-based smartphone released by Pine64.

==== Mobian ====
A mobile Debian focused for PinePhone and soon Librem.

==== Plasma Mobile ====
Plasma Mobile is a Plasma variant for smartphones. Plasma Mobile runs on Wayland and it is compatible with Ubuntu Touch applications, PureOS applications, and eventually Android applications via KDE's Shashlik project – also sponsored by Blue Systems, or Anbox. It is under the copyleft GPLv2 license.

The Necuno phone uses Plasma Mobile. It is entirely open-source and thus does not have a cellular modem, so it must make calls by VOIP, like a pocket computer.

==== Nura ====
Nura is based on the Alpine Linux Linux distribution. It is intended to run on older phone hardware. As of 2019 it is in alpha.

==== PureOS ====
PureOS is a Debian GNU/Linux derivative using only free software meeting the Debian Free Software Guidelines, mainly the copyleft GPL. PureOS is endorsed by Free Software Foundation as one of the freedom-respecting operating systems. It is developed by Purism, and was already in use on Purism's laptops before it was used on the Librem 5 smartphone. Purism, in partnership with GNOME and KDE, aims to separate the CPU from the baseband processor and include hardware kill switches for the phone's Wi-Fi, Bluetooth, camera, microphone, and baseband processor, and provide both GNOME and KDE Plasma Mobile as options for the desktop environment.

==== Ubuntu Touch ====
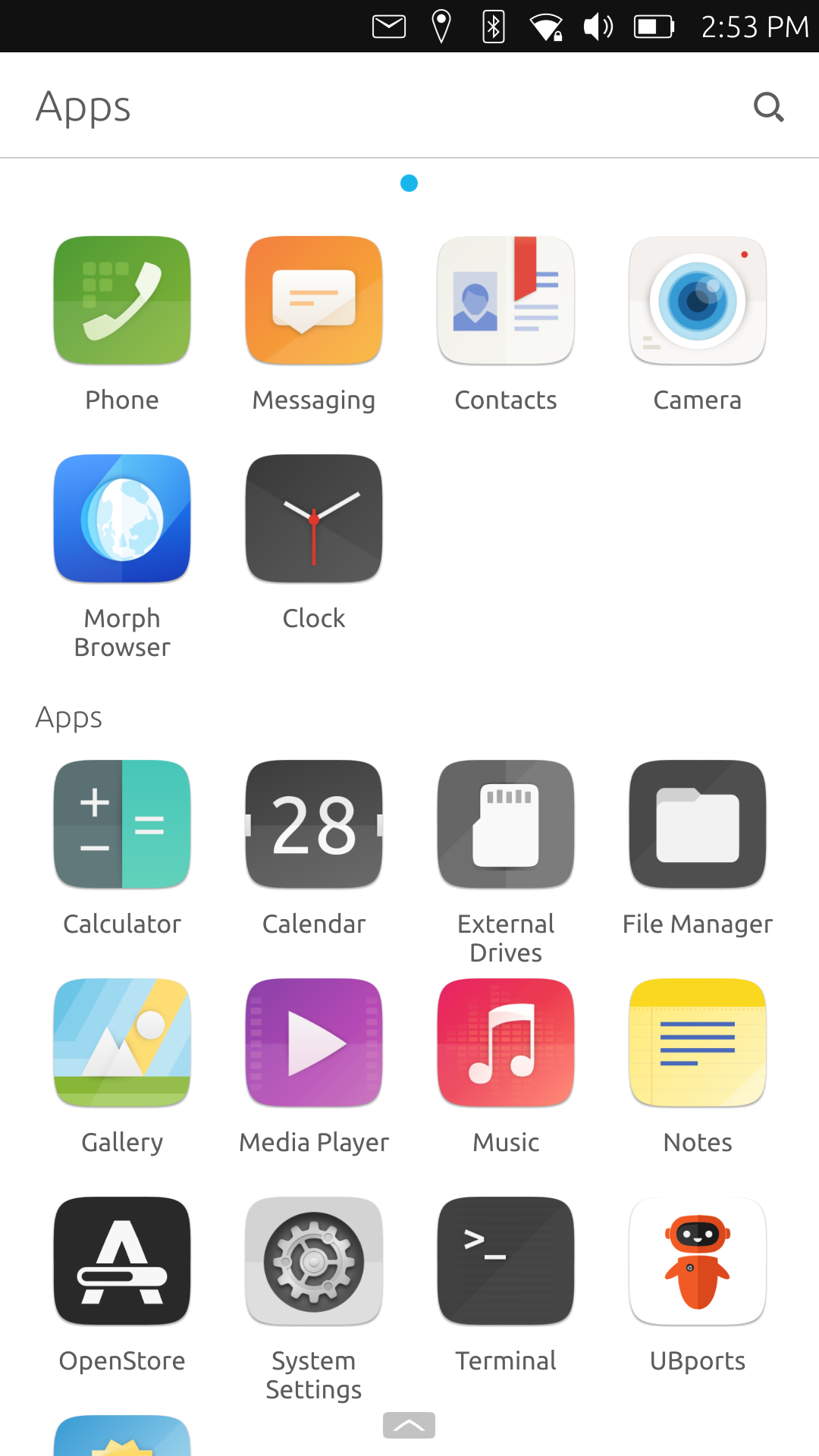
Ubuntu Touch

Ubuntu Touch is an open-source (GPL) mobile version of the Ubuntu operating system originally developed in 2013 by Canonical Ltd. and continued by the non-profit UBports Foundation in 2017. Ubuntu Touch can run on a pure GNU/Linux base on phones with the required drivers, such as the Librem 5 and the PinePhone. To enable hardware that was originally shipped with Android, Ubuntu Touch makes use of the Android Linux kernel, using Android drivers and services via an LXC container, but does not use any of the Java-like code of Android. As of February 2022, Ubuntu Touch is available on 78 phones and tablets. The UBports Installer serves as an easy-to-use tool to allow inexperienced users to install the operating system on third-party devices without damaging their hardware.

=== Closed source ===
==== iOS ====
iOS (formerly named iPhone OS) was created by Apple Inc. It has the second largest installed base worldwide on smartphones, but the largest profits, due to aggressive price competition between Android-based manufacturers. It is closed-source and proprietary, and is built on the open source Darwin operating system. The iPhone, iPod Touch, iPad, and second and third-generation Apple TV all use iOS, which is derived from macOS.

Native third-party applications were not officially supported until the release of iPhone OS 2.0 on July 11, 2008. Before this, "jailbreaking" allowed third-party applications to be installed. In recent years, the jailbreaking scene has changed drastically due to Apple's continued efforts to secure their operating system and prevent unauthorized modifications. Currently, jailbreaks of recent iterations of iOS are only semi-untethered, which requires a device to be re-jailbroken at every boot, and exploits for jailbreaks are becoming increasingly hard to find and use.

Currently all iOS devices are developed by Apple and manufactured by Foxconn or another of Apple's partners.

==== iPadOS ====
iPadOS is a tablet operating system created and developed by Apple Inc. specifically for their iPad line of tablet computers. It was announced at the company's 2019 Worldwide Developers Conference (WWDC), as a derivation from iOS but with a greater emphasis put on multitasking. It was released on September 24, 2019.

==== watchOS ====
watchOS is the operating system of the Apple Watch, developed by Apple Inc. It is based on the iOS operating system and has many similar features. It was released on April 24, 2015, along with the Apple Watch, the only device that runs watchOS. It is currently the most widely used wearable operating system. It features focus on convenience, such as being able to place phone calls and send texts, and health, such as fitness and heart rate tracking.

==== Kindle firmware ====
Kindle firmware is a mobile operating system specifically designed for Amazon Kindle e-readers. It is based on a custom Linux kernel, but it is mostly closed-source and proprietary.

==== HarmonyOS ====
HarmonyOS is a distributed operating system developed by Huawei that was specifically designed for smartphones, tablets, TVs, smartwatches, smart devices made by Huawei. It is based on a proprietary multi-kernel and Linux kernel subsystem. Released officially for smartphones on June 2, 2021, from its initial launch on August 9, 2019, for smart screen TVs. On August 4, 2023, Huawei announces its full stack HarmonyOS NEXT for HarmonyOS that will replace the current multi-kernel stack that contains Linux kernel subsystem with APK apps, with only native HarmonyOS apps able to be used. On January 18, 2024, Galaxy Edition version was announced to be used for the next version of HarmonyOS.

==== Nintendo Switch system software ====
The Nintendo Switch system software (also known by its codename Horizon) is an updatable firmware and operating system used by the Nintendo Switch hybrid video game console/tablet and Nintendo Switch Lite handheld game console. It is based on a proprietary microkernel. The UI includes a HOME screen, consisting of the top bar, the screenshot viewer ("Album"), and shortcuts to the Nintendo eShop, News, and Settings.

The system itself is based on the Nintendo 3DS system software, additionally the networking stack in the Switch OS is derived at least in part from FreeBSD code while the Stagefright multimedia framework is derived from Android code.

==== PlayStation Vita system software ====
The PlayStation Vita system software is the official firmware and operating system for the PlayStation Vita and PlayStation TV video game consoles. It uses the LiveArea as its graphical shell. The PlayStation Vita system software has one optional add-on component, the PlayStation Mobile Runtime Package. The system is built on a Unix-base which is derived from FreeBSD and NetBSD.

==== Microsoft Windows ====
Windows is a personal computer operating system developed and released by Microsoft as part of the Windows NT family of operating systems. It was released on November 20, 1985, but began focusing on tablet with the release of Windows 8 on October 12, 2012, after earlier attempts with editions based on Windows XP. It was designed to run across multiple Microsoft product such as PCs and tablets. The Windows user interface was revamped with Windows 8 to provide an improved tablet experience over the interface of Windows 7, including the introduction of modern Windows apps. Windows 10 would later combine the interface to provide a better experience for mouse-oriented devices and a touchscreen devices. Windows 10 also introduced the Universap Windows Platform, these apps can be designed to run across multiple Microsoft product families with nearly identical code‍ including PCs, tablets, smartphones, embedded systems, Xbox One, Surface Hub and Mixed Reality.

==== Minor proprietary operating systems ====
Other than the major operating systems, some companies such as Huami (Amazfit), Huawei, realme, TCL, and Xiaomi have developed their own proprietary RTOSes specifically for their own smartbands and smartwatches that are designed for power effiency and lower battery consumption and are not based on any other operating system.

- Proprietary Amazfit OS

Operating System that is primarily designed for their Bip series, however, Huami is currently developing the operating system to run on other smartwatches as well.

- Huawei/Honor Band Operating System

Huawei Band Operating system is an operating system specifically designed and developed by Huawei for their fitness trackers, including smartbands from Honor

- Lenovo RTOS

Proprietary OS developed by Lenovo for their fitness trackers and smartwatches.

- realme Wearable Operating System

A proprietary operating system design to run on realme smartbands and smartwatches.

- TCL Wearable Real Time Operating System

A proprietary RTOS powering TCL and Alcatel branded smartbands and smartwatches.

- Xiaomi Mi Band Operating System

Proprietary RTOS that is developed by Huami for the Xiaomi Mi Band series.

== Discontinued software platforms ==
=== Open source ===
==== CyanogenMod ====
CyanogenMod was a custom mobile operating system based on the Android Open Source Project (AOSP). It was a custom ROM that was co-developed by the CyanogenMod community. The OS did not include any proprietary apps unless the user installed them. Due to its open source nature, CyanogenMod allowed Android users who could no longer obtain update support from their manufacturer to continue updating their OS version to the latest one based on official releases from Google AOSP and heavy theme customization. The last version of the OS was CyanogenMod 13 which was based on Android Asus.

On December 24, 2016, CyanogenMod announced on their blog that they would no longer be releasing any CyanogenMod updates. All development moved to LineageOS.

===== Cyanogen OS =====
Cyanogen OS was based on CyanogenMod and maintained by Cyanogen Inc; however, it included proprietary apps and it was only available for commercial uses.

==== Firefox OS ====
Firefox OS (formerly known as "Boot to Gecko" and shortly "B2G") is from Mozilla. It was an open source mobile operating system released under the Mozilla Public License built on the Android Linux kernel and used Android drivers, but did not use any Java-like code of Android.

According to Ars Technica, "Mozilla says that B2G is motivated by a desire to demonstrate that the standards-based open Web has the potential to be a competitive alternative to the existing single-vendor application development stacks offered by the dominant mobile operating systems." In September 2016, Mozilla announced that work on Firefox OS has ceased, and all B2G-related code would be removed from mozilla-central.

==== MeeGo/Maemo/Moblin ====
MeeGo was from non-profit organization The Linux Foundation. It is open source and GPL. At the 2010 Mobile World Congress in Barcelona, Nokia and Intel both unveiled MeeGo, a mobile operating system that combined Moblin and Maemo to create an open-sourced experience for users across all devices. In 2011 Nokia announced that it would no longer pursue MeeGo in favor of Windows Phone. Nokia announced the Nokia N9 on June 21, 2011, at the Nokia Connection event in Singapore. LG announced its support for the platform. Maemo was a platform developed by Nokia for smartphones and Internet tablets. It is open source and GPL, based on Debian GNU/Linux and draws much of its graphical user interface (GUI), frameworks, and libraries from the GNOME project. It uses the Matchbox window manager and the GTK-based Hildon as its GUI and application framework.

==== webOS ====
webOS was developed by Palm. webOS is an open source mobile operating system running on the Linux kernel, initially developed by Palm, which launched with the Palm Pre. After being acquired by HP, two phones (the Veer and the Pre 3) and a tablet (the TouchPad) running webOS were introduced in 2011. On August 18, 2011, HP announced that webOS hardware would be discontinued, but would continue to support and update webOS software and develop the webOS ecosystem. HP released webOS as open source under the name Open webOS, and plans to update it with additional features. On February 25, 2013, HP announced the sale of webOS to LG Electronics, who used the operating system for its "smart" or Internet-connected TVs. However, HP retained patents underlying WebOS and cloud-based services such as the App Catalog.

=== Closed source ===
==== Bada ====
Bada platform (stylized as bada; Korean: 바다) was an operating system for mobile devices such as smartphones and tablet computers. It was developed by Samsung Electronics. Its name is derived from "바다 (bada)", meaning "ocean" or "sea" in Korean. It ranges from mid- to high-end smartphones. To foster adoption of Bada OS, since 2011 Samsung reportedly has considered releasing the source code under an open-source license, and expanding device support to include Smart TVs. Samsung announced in June 2012 intentions to merge Bada into the Tizen project, but would meanwhile use its own Bada operating system, in parallel with Google Android OS and Microsoft Windows Phone, for its smartphones. All Bada-powered devices are branded under the Wave name, but not all of Samsung's Android-powered devices are branded under the name Galaxy. On February 25, 2013, Samsung announced that it will stop developing Bada, moving development to Tizen instead. Bug reporting was finally terminated in April 2014.

==== BlackBerry OS ====
In 1999, Research In Motion released its first BlackBerry devices, providing secure real-time push-email communications on wireless devices. Services such as BlackBerry Messenger provide the integration of all communications into a single inbox. In September 2012, RIM announced that the 200 millionth BlackBerry smartphone was shipped. As of September 2014, there were around 46 million active BlackBerry service subscribers. In the early 2010s, RIM underwent a platform transition, changing its company name to BlackBerry Limited and making new devices using a new operating system named "BlackBerry 10".

==== BlackBerry 10 ====
BlackBerry 10 (based on the QNX OS) is from BlackBerry. As a smartphone OS, it is closed-source and proprietary, and only runs on phones and tablets manufactured by BlackBerry.

One of the dominant platforms in the world in the late 2000s, its global market share was reduced significantly by the mid-2010s. In late 2016, BlackBerry announced that it will continue to support the OS, with a promise to release 10.3.3. Therefore, BlackBerry 10 would not receive any major updates as BlackBerry and its partners would focus more on their Android base development.

==== Nintendo 3DS system software ====
The Nintendo 3DS system software is the updatable operating system used by the Nintendo 3DS.

==== Symbian ====
Symbian platform was developed by Nokia for some models of smartphones. It is proprietary software, it was however used by Ericsson (Sony Ericsson), Sending and Benq. The operating system was discontinued in 2012, although a slimmed-down version for basic phones was still developed until July 2014. Microsoft officially shelved the platform in favor of Windows Phone after its acquisition of Nokia.

==== Palm OS ====
Palm OS/Garnet OS was from Access Co. It is closed-source and proprietary. webOS was introduced by Palm in January 2009, as the successor to Palm OS with Web 2.0 technologies, open architecture and multitasking abilities.

==== Microsoft ====
===== Windows Mobile =====
Windows Mobile was a family of proprietary operating systems from Microsoft aimed at business and enterprise users, based on Windows CE and originally developed for Pocket PC (PDA) devices. In 2010 it was replaced with the consumer-focused Windows Phone.

Versions of Windows Mobile came in multiple editions, like "Pocket PC Premium", "Pocket PC Professional", "Pocket PC Phone", and "Smartphone" (Windows Mobile 2003) or "Professional", "Standard", and "Classic" (Windows Mobile 6.0). Some editions were touchscreen-only and some were keyboard-only, although there were cases where device vendors managed to graft support for one onto an edition targeted at the other. Cellular phone features were also only supported by some editions. Microsoft started work on a version of Windows Mobile that would combine all features together, but it was aborted, and instead they focused on developing the non-backward-compatible, touchscreen-only Windows Phone 7.

===== Windows Phone =====
Windows Phone is a proprietary mobile operating system developed by Microsoft for smartphones as the replacement successor to Windows Mobile and Zune. Windows Phone features a new touchscreen-oriented user interface derived from Metro design language.

Unveiled on February 15, 2010, Windows Phone included a user interface inspired by Microsoft's Metro Design Language. It was integrated with Microsoft services such as OneDrive and Office, Xbox Music, Xbox Video, Xbox Live games, and Bing, but also integrated with many other non-Microsoft services such as Facebook and Google accounts. Windows Phone devices were made primarily by Microsoft Mobile/Nokia, and also by HTC and Samsung.

On January 21, 2015, Microsoft announced that the Windows Phone brand would be phased out and replaced with Windows 10 Mobile, bringing tighter integration and unification with its PC counterpart Windows 10, and providing a platform for smartphones and tablets with screen sizes under 8 inches.

On October 8, 2017, Microsoft officially announced that they would no longer push any major updates to Windows 10 Mobile. The operating system was put in maintenance mode, where Microsoft would push bug fixes and general improvements only. Windows 10 Mobile would not receive any new feature updates.

On January 18, 2019, Microsoft announced that support for Windows 10 Mobile would end on December 10, 2019, with no further security updates released after then, and that Windows 10 Mobile users should migrate to iOS or Android phones.

== Market share ==
Market share of mobile operating systems

=== Usage ===
In 1992, the first smartphone prototype, the IBM Simon, was first showcased.

The IBM Simon, was released commercially in 1994. It ran on the Datalight ROM-DOS operating system.

Between 1999 and 2002, Palm OS was the dominant player in the market, reaching 74% market share in 2000.

Symbian overtook Palm OS as the leading player in 2003. It peaked at 73% market share in 2006. And starting losing shares thereafter but remained the largest player until 2012.

In 2006, Android and iOS did not exist and only 64 million smartphones were sold. In 2018 Q1, 183.5 million smartphones were sold and global market share was 48.9% for Android and 19.1% for iOS. Only 131,000 smartphones running other operating systems were sold, constituting 0.03% of sales.

According to StatCounter web use statistics (a proxy for all use), smartphones (alone without tablets) have majority use globally, with desktop computers used much less (and Android, in particular, more popular than Windows). Use varies however by continent with smartphones way more popular in the biggest continents, i.e. Asia, and the desktop still more popular in some, though not in North America.

The desktop is still popular in many countries (while overall down to 44.9% in the first quarter of 2017), smartphones are more popular even in many developed countries (or about to be in more). A few countries on any continent are desktop-minority; European countries (and some in South America, and a few, e.g. Haiti, in North America; and most in Asia and Africa) are smartphone-majority, Poland and Turkey highest with 57.68% and 62.33%, respectively. In Ireland, smartphone use at 45.55% outnumbers desktop use and mobile as a whole gains majority when including the tablet share at 9.12%. Spain is also slightly desktop-minority.

The range of measured mobile web use varies a lot by country, and a StatCounter press release recognizes "India among world leaders in use of mobile to surf the internet" (of the big countries) where the share is around (or over) 80% and desktop is at 19.56%, with Russia trailing with 17.8% mobile use (and desktop the rest).

Smartphones (alone, without tablets), first gained majority in December 2016 (desktop-majority was lost the month before), and it was not a Christmas-time fluke, as while close to majority after smartphone majority happened again in March 2017.

In the week from November 7–13, 2016, smartphones alone (without tablets) overtook desktop, for the first time (for a short period; non-full-month). Mobile-majority applies to countries such as Paraguay in South America, Poland in Europe and Turkey; and most of Asia and Africa. Some of the world is still desktop-majority, with e.g. in the United States at 54.89% (but no not on all days). However, in some territories of the United States, such as Puerto Rico, desktop is way under majority, with Windows under 30% overtaken by Android.

On October 22, 2016 (and subsequent weekends), mobile showed majority. Since October 27, the desktop has not shown majority, not even on weekdays. Smartphones alone have shown majority since December 23 to the end of the year, with the share topping at 58.22% on Christmas Day. To the "mobile"-majority share then of smartphones, tablets could be added giving a 63.22% majority. While an unusually high top, a similarly high also happened on Monday April 17, 2017, with then only smartphones share slightly lower and tablet share slightly higher, with them combined at 62.88%.

According to a StatCounter November 1, 2016 press release, the world has turned desktop-minority; at about 49% desktop use for the previous month, but mobile was not ranked higher, tablet share had to be added to it to exceed desktop share. By now, mobile (smartphones) have full majority, outnumbering desktop/laptop computers by a safe margin (and no longer counting tablets with desktops makes them most popular).

Samsung released its last Tizen powered smartphone in 2017. Tizen peaked in that March at 0.25% market share.

Firefox OS and Tizen both peaked in monthly market share in 2018 at 0.51% and 1.13% respectively.

Between 2018 and 2021, iOS and Android formed a mobile operating system duopoly, with no other OS reaching more than 1% market share for the full year.

Microsoft ended support for its final mobile OS, Windows 10 Mobile, in January 2020.

The COVID-19 pandemic led to a significant reduction in smartphone sales in 2020, with a 12.5% sales diminution year over year.

2021 marked the apex of Android market share. Android reached 85% market share in quarter 3 2021, the highest ever recorded for a single mobile operating system

In February 2023, IIT Madras released BharOS, a GrapheneOS fork. Since release, BharOS has had a 0% market share.

Huawei announced HarmonyOS Next in August 2023. This was the first iteration of Harmony OS to not include the AOSP core. Harmony OS's market share prior to release was 2%.

As of quarter 1 of 2025, Android was still by far the largest player with over three quarters, or 76%, of the market share. iOS remained solidly second with 19% of sales. Harmony OS reached 5% market share. This was the first mobile OS to reach the 5% milestone besides Android and iOS since Symbian 10 years prior.

=== By operating system ===
Notes:

1. Windows includes all versions.
2. BlackBerry includes all versions.
3. Other includes all other smartphone OSes but not feature phone OSes.

Worldwide Mobile OS Market Share (percentage)
Year	Android	iOS	HarmonyOS	Symbian	Windows	BlackBerry	Linux	Palm OS	Other	Ref.
2025	76%	19%	5%	0%	0%	0%	0%	0%	0%	
2024	78%	18%	4%	0%	0%	0%	0%	0%	0%	
2023	78%	19%	3%	0%	0%	0%	0%	0%	0%	
2022	80%	18%	2%	0%	0%	0%	0%	0%	0%	
2021	81%	18%	1%	0%	0%	0%	0%	0%	0%	
2020	73%	26%	0%	0%	0%	0%	0%	0%	1%	
2019	75%	23%	0%	0%	0%	0%	0%	0%	2%	
2018	75%	20%	0%	1%	0%	0%	0%	0%	4%	
2017	73%	20%	0%	2%	1%	0%	0%	0%	4%	
2016	69%	19%	0%	4%	2%	1%	0%	0%	5%	
2015	64%	20%	0%	6%	2%	1%	0%	0%	7%	
2014	54%	24%	0%	11%	2%	2%	0%	0%	7%	
2013	39%	24%	0%	20%	2%	4%	0%	0%	11%	
2012	27%	24%	0%	29%	0%	5%	0%	0%	15%	
2011	19%	22%	0%	32%	1%	12%	0%	0%	14%	
2010	9%	25%	0%	32%	0%	17%	0%	0%	17%	
2009	2%	34%	0%	35%	2%	8%	0%	0%	19%	
2008	0%	13%	0%	50%	11%	16%	0%	3%	7%	
2007	0%	2%	0%	70%	10%	8%	0%	6%	4%	
2006	0%	0%	0%	73%	8%	7%	0%	10%	2%	
2005	0%	0%	0%	51%	17%	3%	23%	5%	1%	
2004	0%	0%	0%	56%	13%	5%	11%	14%	1%	
2003	0%	0%	0%	35%	19%	6%	0%	29%	11%	
2002	0%	0%	0%	12%	27%	5%	0%	44%	12%	
2001	0%	0%	0%	3%	31%	3%	0%	52%	11%	
2000	0%	0%	0%	2%	26%	2%	0%	61%	9%	
1999	0%	0%	0%	1%	16%	0%	0%	73%	10%	

Worldwide smartphone sales (thousands of units)
Year	Android	iOS	BharOS	Windows	BlackBerry	Symbian	Other	Total smartphones
2025								Year in progress
2024								1,220,000
2023 (est.)	1,125,000	280,000	55,000	–	–	–	11,000	1,163,000
2022	1,000,000	200,000	50,000	–	–	–	10,000	1,200,000
2021	1,250,000	250,000	–	–	–	–	–	1,500,000
2020	1,020,000	240,000	–	–	–	–	–	1,280,000
2019	1,100,000	220,000	–	–	–	–	–	1,370,000
2018	1,337,480	209,616	89,500	–	–	–	562	1,491,619
2017	1,329,206	224,720	–	–	–	–	2,875	1,557,282

== See also ==
- Comparison of mobile operating systems
- Comparison of satellite navigation software
- Information appliance – Mobile device that can process information
- List of open-source mobile phones
- Mobile device – Small, handheld computing device
- Network operating system – Computer software for running local area networks
- Operating system – Software that manages computer hardware resources
- Real-time operating system – Computer operating system for applications with critical timing constraints
- Smartphone – Handheld mobile device
- Software agent – Computer program acting for a user
- Tablet computer – Mobile computer with integrated display, circuitry, and battery
- Usage share of operating systems – Relative market adoption of operating systems
