= CMD RAMLink =

RAM disk for Commodore's C64/128 home computers

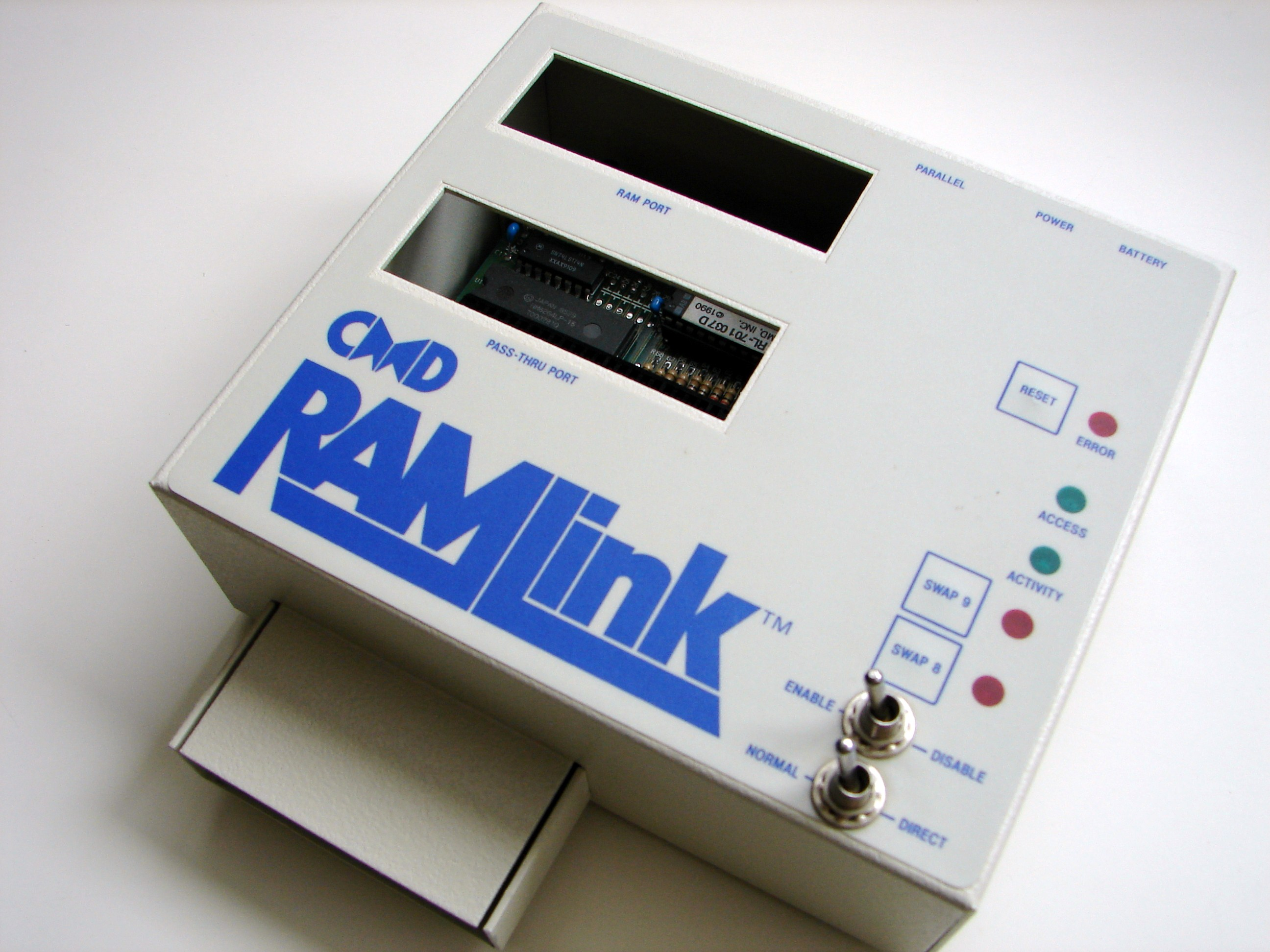
RAMLink device

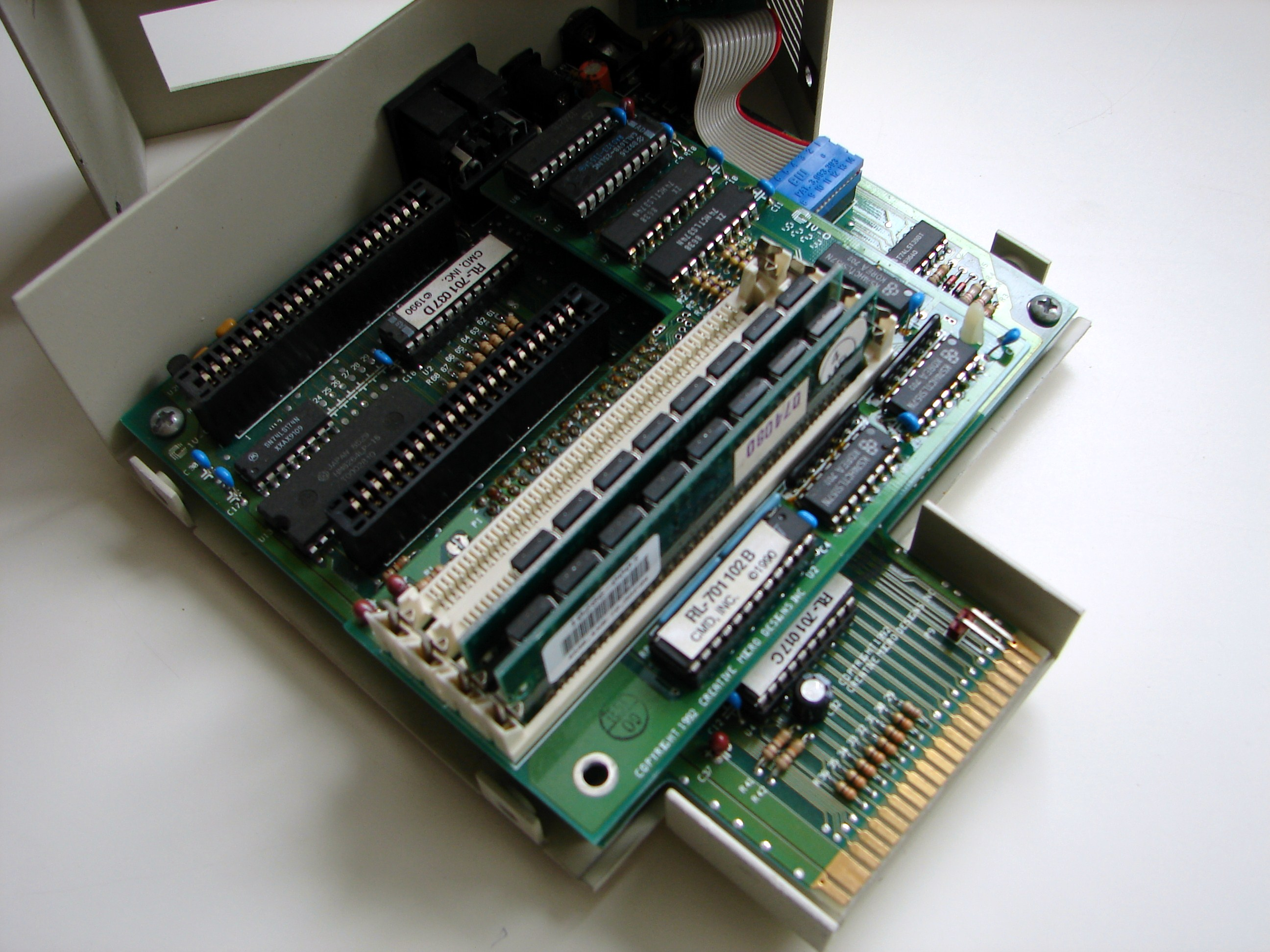
Inside the RAMLink

The RAMLink is one of several RAM expansion products that was made by Creative Micro Designs (CMD) for Commodore's C64/128 home computers. The RAMLink was intended as a third-party alternative, successor and optionally companion to Commodore's own 17xx-series REU RAM expansion cartridges.

Unlike the REU, the RAMLink is externally powered and designed from the ground-up to act as a RAM disk.

== Features ==
- Allows up to 16 MB of expansion RAM. The expansion memory can be provided by a combination of 30-pin SIMM RAM on an internal card, a Commodore 17xx-series REU (or a clone) plugged into the RAM Port, or a GeoRAM.
- Provides its own copy of JiffyDOS, allowing accelerated operation with any other JiffyDOS-equipped disk device, as well as shorthand commands (DOS Wedge) to conveniently access any other connected storage devices.
- Full set of partitioning tools and DOS commands.
- Commodore 1541, 1571 and 1581 disk-layout emulation modes
- One partition type provides Direct-access REU-like capability
- Secondary power socket and on-board charging circuit to accept a 6-volt "sealed" lead acid backup battery.
- Battery-backed real time clock for time and date stamping of files, if the internal RAM card is present.
- Includes drivers to allow GEOS to use its memory as either a replacement for swap space, or as a regular 'disk' drive.
- Custom parallel connection for the CMD HD Series line of hard drives.
- Pass-through expansion port for standard cartridges (e.g. Action Replay, Super Snapshot)
- On-device buttons to swap device numbers with other drives, switches to disable 17xx-series REUs or change their handling.
