= Commodore REU =

Memory expansion technology

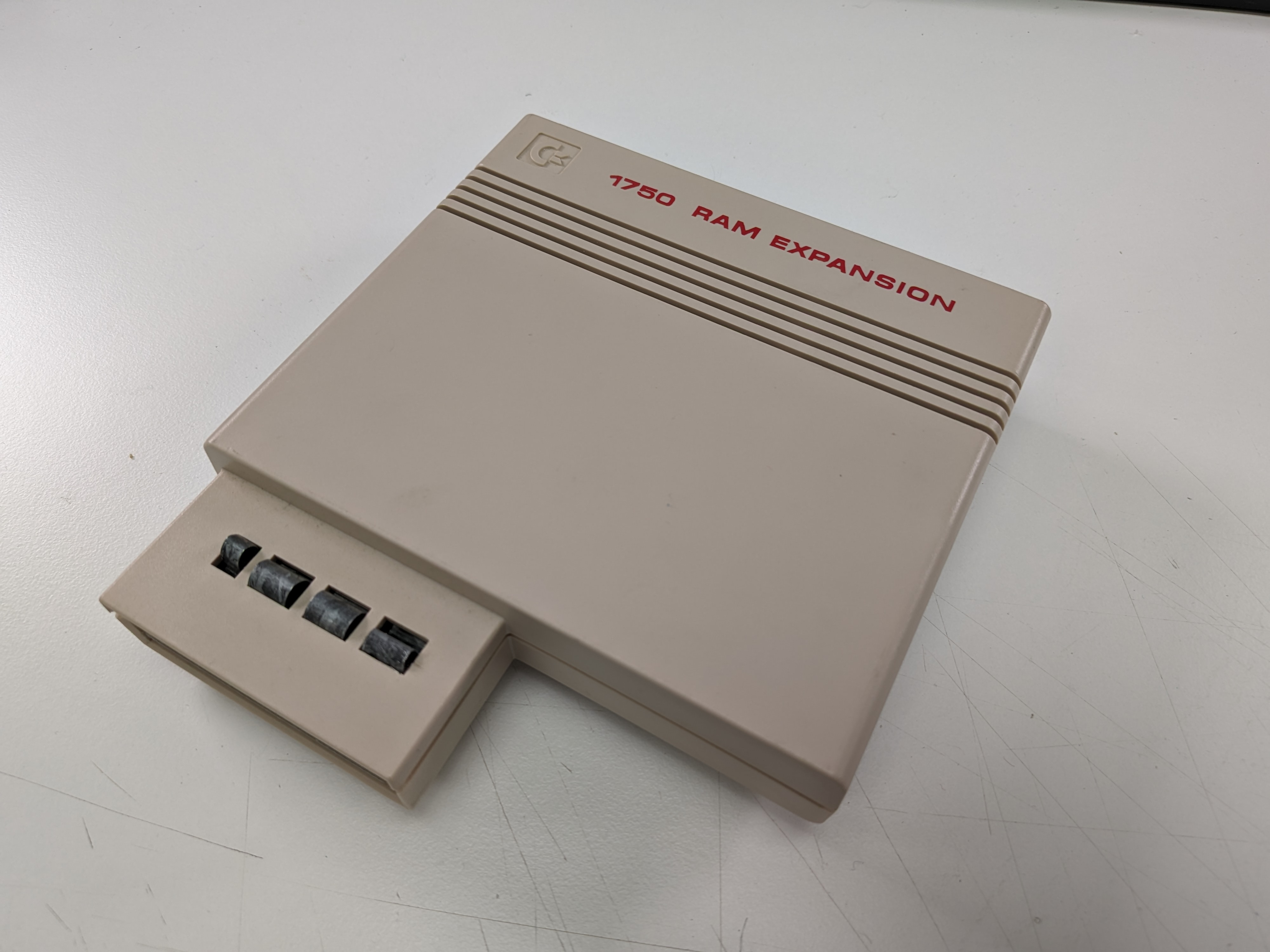
- Manufacturer: Commodore Business Machines (CBM)
- Type: Memory expansion
- Release date: 1986; 40 years ago
- Discontinued: 1990; 36 years ago
- CPU: MOS 8726 REC (RAM Expansion Controller) DMA ASIC
- Memory: 128 KB RAM (1700); 256 KB RAM (1764); 512 KB RAM (1750)
- Storage: 4164 64kx1 or 41256 256kx1 DRAM ICs

The Commodore RAM Expansion Unit (REU) is a range of external RAM add-ons.

At the time of introduction of the Commodore 128 home computer, two REUs were announced for that model; the 1700 (128 KB) and 1750 (512 KB) REUs. Later, Commodore introduced a third model, for their Commodore 64 model: the 1764 (256 KB)

The need for the REU came about when Commodore management decided to not use the final version of the custom Memory Management Unit (MMU) which then limited the size of memory in spite of early discussion of a larger memory map. Engineers traveling to the 1985 Consumer Electronics Show (CES) were confronted with flyers and billboards advertising a memory size that was no longer supported and finally the top management asked where the additional memory (up to 512 KB) would plug in.

By the time of the 1985 CES show in Chicago, the engineers were able to display a spinning globe of the earth as a demonstration of Direct Memory Access (DMA) by the new REU units.

The REU hardware was designed by Frank Palia and the dedicated RAM Expansion Controller (REC) integrated circuit (IC) was designed by Victor Andrade. Fred Bowen and Terry Ryan adapted the C128's KERNAL and BASIC to accommodate the REU natively and Hedley Davis wrote the globe spinning demo which was an impressive display of animation in the mid-1980s.

== Hardware description ==
Official performance demonstration

Although the C128 could access more than 64 KB of RAM through bank switching, the memory inside the REU could only be accessed by memory-transfers (STORE/LOAD/SWAP/COMPAREs) between the main memory and the REU memory. Additionally, the C128's built-in BASIC 7.0 had three statements, STASH, FETCH, and SWAP, for storing and retrieving data from the REU.

Officially, only the 1700 and 1750 were supported on the C128. The 256 KB model, the 1764, was released for the C64 at the same time. There were only minor differences between the three models. The original C64 power supply could not support the additional load presented by the 1764 so a 2.5 ampere C64 power supply was included.

The 1700 uses sixteen 4164 64kx1 DRAM ICs, the 1764 has eight 41256 256kx1 DRAMs, and the 1750 has sixteen 41256 DRAMs.

In practice, the difference between the 1764 and the earlier units had little effect on compatibility, and people used 1700s and 1750s successfully with the C64, and 1764s successfully with the C128, although the C64's stock power supply was inadequate to reliably handle the power load of any of them. Some dealers unbundled the 1764 and the power supply in order to sell the power supply to C64 users, and/or upgrade the 1764 to 512 KB.

The REU model 1750 can be modified to support up to 2MB on memory by installing 2 additional ICs for bank switch. There is only one source of software incompatibility in this modification: software that doesn't set the bits at $DF06 to the same value at all times, or sets the bits to a bank of 512 kb that isn't installed yet, won't work.

During the late 1980s, there was a shortage of DRAM thus 1750s were rare and expensive. However it was comparatively easy to upgrade a 1700 or 1764 to 512 KB. Several firms did this commercially, either selling upgraded units or upgrading customer-supplied units.

In the early 1990s, DIY modification schemes to increase the capacity of an REU to one megabyte or higher appeared on various online services.

== Model differences ==
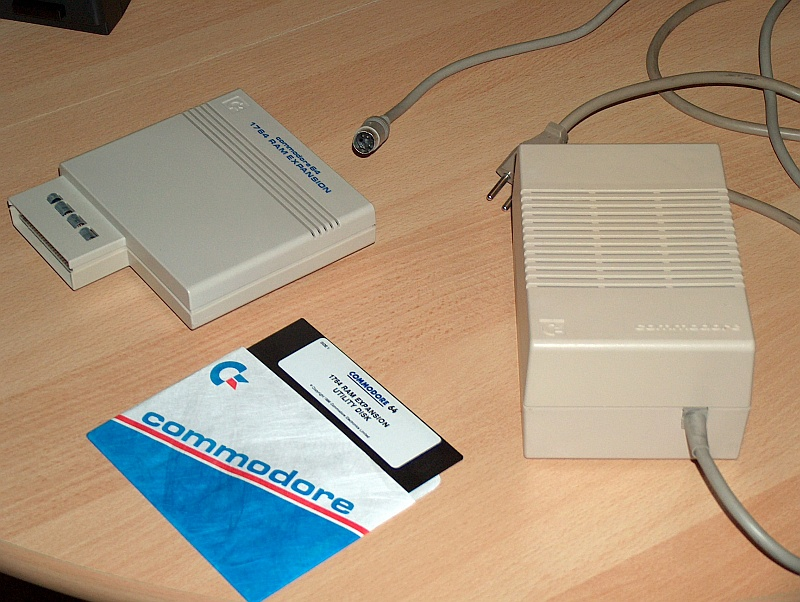
1764 REU with Utility Disk and 2.5 ampere power supply

The 1700s circuit board was identical to that of the 1750, and a trace marked J1 indicated the size of the chips used. On the 1750 and 1764, this trace was cut.

The 1700 and 1750 had a resistor at position R4 that, according to Commodore engineer Fred Bowen, compensated for subtle timing differences in the expansion port on the C64 and C128. The 1764 lacked that resistor. Bowen and other CBM engineers recommended against using a 1764 with a C128 unless the resistor was added, or a 1700/1750 with a C64 unless the resistor was removed.

It was possible to check for the presence of a 1750 by reading memory address $DF00's bit 4, which was 1 on a 1750, and 0 on a 1700 or 1764. However, this procedure would not distinguish between a 1700 and a 1764. To solve this, programmers wrote to, then read from, the REU's RAM to find out the amount of memory installed.

== REU software support ==
A small percentage of software made use of the REUs. Like other add-on products from Commodore, their relatively small installed base relative to the huge number of C64s & C128s made software developers hesitant to invest much time and effort in supporting REUs. The lack of commercial support kept sales lower than they otherwise might have been. Due to its high speed relative to Commodore's floppy drives or even the commercially available hard drives, REUs did see support in the Commodore BBS community. Programs such as Color64 required a REU to minimize load times when switching between sections of the BBS.

The REUs came with software to use the extra memory as a RAM disk, but the RAM disk's compatibility with commercial software varied as some commercial software relied heavily on various quirks of the Commodore 1541 floppy drive. Additionally, many commercial programs simply overwrote the memory space occupied by the RAM disk software.

The GEOS operating system had built in support for the REU as a RAM disk, as did the C128's version of CP/M, and some disk copy programs used the REU to facilitate high-speed copying with a single disk drive. GEOS as well as other programs even used the REU for quick memory transfers within the host machine's main memory by storing a memory block into the REU and then fetching it back to another location. Using this method, only the actual data to be transferred needed to travel on the machine's data bus—unlike the ordinary method, which had the computer's CPU do the transfer, thus spending at least three quarters of the bus capacity on instruction fetches and only one quarter or less on payload data.

== See also ==
- Super 1750 Clone
- geoRAM
- Creative Micro Designs RAMLink
- Creative Micro Designs 2 MB REU, (1750 XL)
