= Windows 10 Mobile version history =

Version history of the Windows 10 Mobile operating system

Windows 10 Mobile is a discontinued mobile operating system developed by Microsoft. It was released to manufacturing on November 20, 2015, and was made generally available on March 17, 2016. In October 2017, Microsoft announced that it would pause the active development of Windows 10 Mobile, and future development will be limited to maintenance releases and security patches. The last feature update is the Fall Creators Update, which reached end of support on January 14, 2020. Development for Windows 10 Mobile has completely ceased since then.

== Overview ==
Windows 10 Mobile versions
Release			Release date	Latest release		Supported until
Version	Name	Codename	Release date	Version	Release date	Supported until
1511	November Update	Threshold 2	November 12, 2015	10586.682	November 14, 2016	January 9, 2018
1607	Anniversary Update	Redstone	August 16, 2016	14393.2551	October 9, 2018	October 9, 2018
1703	Creators Update	Redstone 2	April 25, 2017	15063.1868	June 11, 2019	June 11, 2019
1709	Fall Creators Update	Feature 2	October 24, 2017	15254.603	January 14, 2020	December 10, 2019
Legend: Unsupported Supported Latest version Preview version

== Version history ==
=== Version 1511 (original release) ===
The original version of Windows 10 Mobile (also known as version 1511 and codenamed "Threshold 2") was released to the public on November 12, 2015. It carries the build number 10.0.10586.

The update reached end of service on January 9, 2018.

Preview versions of Windows 10 Mobile, version 1511
Version	Release date(s)	Highlights
9941.12498	Fast and slow ring: February 12, 2015	This is the first public Windows 10 mobile pre-release build. It includes various changes from the operating system's predecessor, Windows Phone 8.1. The changes include an updated Start Screen where the wallpaper is displayed behind translucent tiles rather than within them and Live Tiles that can has a new tall size option for apps that support it. This feature would be removed in subsequent builds. Further changes to the Start screen includes app list redesigned with wallpaper as background, recent installed apps being shown at top, and the ability to search for apps though a prominent search box rather than a search button. Other changes include changes to the general user experience, including the ability to expand notifications, actionable notifications, Action Center with additional settings toggles and same design across Windows 10 devices. The keyboard has been updated to contains virtual pointing stick for text selection and a voice input button. With this build, notifications can be synchronized between other Windows 10 devices. Furthermore, pressing and holding on any toggle in Action Center takes the user to respective settings of that option When shutting down the device the OS displays a reminder of coming calendar events on screen Security features for this build include device encryption option. New apps included in this build include a new file explorer app, an Alarms app, adding world clock, timer, and stopwatch modes, and a calculator app with a built in unit converter, The web browser rendering engine of Microsoft Edge is hosted in Internet Explorer, with the intention of Internet Explorer being replaced by Microsoft Edge in later builds. The system's default camera app is now an updated version of the Lumia Camera app. Other apps include the photos app with OneDrive synchronization, collections and automatic photo enhancements, and the universal Sound recording app. The operating system also introduces the universal Settings app ported from the PC version.
10.0.10051		
10.0.10052	Fast ring: April 21, 2015	
10.0.10136	Fast ring: June 16, 2015	Microsoft introduces the Reachability feature for 5" devices and above, allowing users to press and hold the Windows button for entire screen to slide down fore easier reach topmost UI elements. Battery Saver now displays detailed information on an application's battery usage concerning lighting up the screen, running the processor or transferring data The settings app offers Split-view when in landscape mode on higher-res displays, offering a UI almost identical to that on the PC "Project Spartan" web browser adds the following features: InPrivate mode, secure sites – marked with a badge, full-screen videos, a "Save as" option for web images to convert files into .png or .jpg images (in later betas, and released Windows 10, this app is branded as Microsoft Edge) Other changes include 3G only setting for highest connection speed, more improvements to Cortana, the ability enable and disable OneDrive backups for individual applications, Digital video stabilization, and VPN Point to Point Tunnelling Protocol (PPTP) and Secure Socket Tunnelling Protocol (SSTP). This build also has several minor UI changes, including the All Apps letter 'jump' buttons are ALL CAPS instead of lower case, search box replacing the search button at the top of the all apps list Internet Explorer Mobile is removed from this build.
10.0.10149	Fast ring: June 25, 2015; Slow ring: July 8, 2015	"Project Spartan" is now branded as Microsoft Edge. Microsoft Edge gained option to view a website as "desktop" or "mobile". The browser's address bar moved to bottom of the screen This build brings updated icons and visuals (including visual controls). Flashlight toggle is added as a quick action in the Action Center. Quiet hours now has to be enabled from Cortana's notebook. Option for hiding notification panes on the lockscreen has been added. Finally, download limit on 3G networks removed. The Photos app now shows albums (Camera roll, screenshots, saved photos);it also gained support for opening .gif files. Automatic camera roll back up is now enabled from the OneDrive application. The built-in camera application now supports Face detection This build also adds support for HTTP Live Streaming.
10.0.10166	Fast ring: July 10, 2015 Slow ring: July 22, 2015	This build finally removes the legacy Windows Phone 8.1 app store leaving only the Windows 10 version of the store app. Consequently, the Windows 10 store app loses the beta label.

=== Version 1607 (Anniversary Update) ===
The Windows 10 Mobile Anniversary Update (also known as version 1607 and codenamed "Redstone 1") is the first major update to Windows 10 Mobile and the first in a series of updates under the "Redstone" codenames. It carries the build number 10.0.14393. The first preview was released on February 19, 2016. It was released to the public on August 16, 2016.

The update reached end of service after the release of build 14393.2551 on October 9, 2018.

Preview versions of Windows 10 Mobile, version 1607
Version	Release date(s)	Highlights
10.0.14267	Fast ring: February 19, 2016	New music search icon in Cortana; Improvements to Microsoft Edge and Messaging + Skype; Reliability improvements for keyboards with large dictionaries
10.0.14267.1004	Fast ring: February 24, 2016	New Visual Voicemail feature for dual-SIM devices; Re-enabled history feature in People app
10.0.14283	Fast ring: March 10, 2016	Improvements to the Phone, Outlook Mail and Calendar apps
10.0.14291	Fast ring: March 17, 2016	Improvements to Microsoft Edge; New Japanese one-handed kana touch keyboard; New Feedback Hub app; Improvements to Word Flow recognition of longer words
10.0.14295	Fast ring: March 25, 2016 Slow ring: March 30, 2016	
10.0.14322	Fast ring: April 14, 2016	Improvements to the Action Center, Notifications, Cortana, Microsoft Edge and Lock screen experience; Updated the Settings app; New icons for individual settings pages; New Navigation bar settings page and vibration setting; Updated Battery Settings and Battery Saving Experience; Glance screen settings have moved; Updated Windows Update Settings; New emoji; Added USB Ethernet Support with Continuum; New comment feature in the Feedback Hub
10.0.14327	Fast ring: April 20, 2016	New Messaging Everywhere feature; Enabled Cortana for more languages
10.0.14328	Fast ring: April 22, 2016	Improvements to Start experience
10.0.14332	Fast ring: April 26, 2016	Improvements to the share UI for Cortana Reminders; Reliability improvements to the Chinese IME
10.0.14342	Fast ring: May 16, 2016 Slow ring: May 31, 2016	New swipe navigation feature in Microsoft Edge; New Apps for websites feature; Improvements to Feedback Hub; Increased font size and improved spacing of the data migration page; Polished media controls interface on the Lock screen; Improved performance when retrieving updated GPS coordinates while driving
10.0.14356	Fast ring: June 1, 2016	Improvements to Cortana and Glance screen; Updated the UI for rearranging Quick Actions in the Settings app; Updated thumbnail generation logic; Updated the Mobile Hotspot settings page; Reliability improvement to Cortana
10.0.14361	Fast ring: June 8, 2016	Improvements to Settings; Polished the notification dismissal model; Reliability improvement to Cortana; Introduced one-handed keyboard for 5-inch devices
10.0.14364	Fast ring: June 14, 2016	Minor visual enhancements to the Settings app
10.0.14367	Fast ring: June 16, 2016 Slow ring: June 21, 2016	
10.0.14371	Fast ring: June 21, 2016	New Microsoft Wallet app
10.0.14372	Fast ring: June 23, 2016 Slow ring: June 28, 2016	
10.0.14376	Fast ring: June 28, 2016	Updated the Gadgets app; Messaging Everywhere has been removed from the Messaging app
10.0.14379	Fast ring: June 30, 2016	
10.0.14383	Fast ring: July 7, 2016	Improved battery performance for turning the screen on and off to look at the lock screen
10.0.14385	Fast ring: July 9, 2016	Improved battery performance on older devices
10.0.14388	Fast ring: July 12, 2016 Slow ring: July 15, 2016	
10.0.14390	Fast ring: July 15, 2016	

=== Version 1703 (Creators Update) ===
The Windows 10 Mobile Creators Update (also known as version 1703 and codenamed "Redstone 2") is the second major update to Windows 10 Mobile and the second in a series of updates under the "Redstone" codenames. It carries the build number 10.0.15063. The first preview was released to Insiders on August 17, 2016. It was released to the public on April 25, 2017.

The update reached end of service after the release of build 15063.1868 on June 11, 2019.

Preview versions of Windows 10 Mobile, version 1703
Version	Release date(s)	Highlights
10.0.14905	Fast ring: August 17, 2016	With this build, narrator has been improved in regards to using common keyboard navigation in tables. Keyboard shortcut Ctrl+O for focusing on the address bar is also added to Microsoft Edge. New system sounds and ringtones are added.
10.0.14915	Fast ring: August 31, 2016	Manually dragging MP3 or WMA files to the device's "Ringtones" folder either from a PC or downloaded from within the device will allow the media to be available for use as ringtone or alarm.
10.0.14926	Fast ring: September 14, 2016	The same snooze feature from PC is available on mobile, along with the performance improvements in text-entry heavy sites. The Wi-Fi settings page from the PC makes its way to Mobile, set to replace the legacy Windows Phone 8.1 based Wi-Fi settings page. However, as of now, the legacy Wi-Fi settings page also remains as a temporary fallback.
10.0.14931	Fast ring: September 21, 2016 Slow ring: October 5, 2016	The Windows Feedback Hub app has been updated to include a dark mode that can be set by the user or automatically based on system theme, a settings page, and author's name in the details section of feedbacks. Other app updates include Windows Maps, which introduces the ability to check traffic for the commute route between home and work. The user can also see recently viewed traffic cameras for a particular rout. Finally, the app also includes a dark mode, which can be set by the user or automatically based on the system theme. The UWP Skype app also received an update to allow users to send SMS from their PC and relay it through their Windows Mobile device. Messages sent on Windows 10 Mobile will be visible on the PC and vice versa. This build also includes support for USB Audio 2.0 out of the box.
10.0.14936	Fast ring: September 28, 2016	
10.0.14942	Fast ring: October 7, 2016	Added address bar in Registry Editor; Few minor improvements towards system stability
10.0.14946	Fast ring: October 13, 2016	New separate screen time-out settings when using Continuum; Updates to Wi-Fi Settings page; New options to prevent autocorrection and remove a word from user dictionary
10.0.14951	Fast ring: October 19, 2016	Simplified camera interface
10.0.14955	Fast ring: October 25, 2016	Updates to Outlook Mail and Calendar apps
10.0.14959	Fast ring: November 3, 2016	
10.0.14965	Fast ring: November 9, 2016 Slow ring: November 17, 2016	
10.0.14977	Fast ring: December 1, 2016	Enable to read EPUB books in Microsoft Edge
10.0.15007	Fast ring: January 12, 2017	Removed Apps Corner; Zoom enabled for all webpages in Microsoft Edge; UWP app scrollbar improvements; Apps can now be reset; Cortana can now control music playback and volume; Added recurrence options for Cortana reminders; Settings app improvements
10.0.15014	Fast ring: January 19, 2017	Merged Wi-Fi settings under Wi-Fi Services section in Settings app; Improved display speed of HTTP images on live tiles; Stylized notification buttons are aligned to the right
10.0.15025	Fast ring: February 2, 2017	Microsoft Edge can now read aloud e-books; Updated emoji for Microsoft Edge; Added Collections to Feedback Hub; Support for mono audio
10.0.15031	Fast ring: February 9, 2017	New Share icon; Rainbow flag added to emoji keyboard; The emoji keyboard will now remain open after inserting an emoji by default
10.0.15043	Fast ring: February 24, 2017 Slow ring: March 2, 2017	Improved Continuum video playback for Miracast
10.0.15047	Fast ring: March 3, 2017	
10.0.15051	Fast ring: March 8, 2017 Slow ring: March 10, 2017	
10.0.15055	Fast ring: March 10, 2017	

=== Version 1709 (Fall Creators Update) ===
The Windows 10 Mobile Fall Creators Update (also known as version 1709 and Feature 2) is the third and final major update to Windows 10 Mobile and the third and last in a series of updates under the "Redstone" codenames. It carries the build number 10.0.15254. Despite sharing the same version number with the PC version of Windows 10 Fall Creators Update ("Redstone 3"), the update is still part of the "Redstone 2" branch. The first preview was released to Insiders on April 14, 2017. It was released to the public on October 24, 2017.

The update reached end of service after the release of build 15254.603 on January 14, 2020.

Preview versions of Windows 10 Mobile, version 1709
Version	Release date(s)	Highlights
10.0.15204	Fast ring: April 14, 2017	New privacy page to the Windows 10 Mobile OOBE experience
10.0.15205	Fast ring: April 19, 2017	
10.0.15207	Fast ring: April 24, 2017	
10.0.15208	Fast ring: April 28, 2017	
10.0.15210	Fast ring: May 4, 2017	
10.0.15213	Fast ring: May 11, 2017	
10.0.15215	Fast ring: May 17, 2017	
10.0.16212	All rings: June 1, 2017	Accidental Release
10.0.15222	Fast ring: June 8, 2017	
10.0.15223	Fast ring: June 13, 2017	
10.0.15228	Fast ring: June 28, 2017	
10.0.15230	Fast ring: July 13, 2017	
10.0.15235	Fast ring: July 26, 2017	Portrait mode support for Continuum
10.0.15237	Fast ring: August 2, 2017	
10.0.15240	Fast ring: August 9, 2017 Slow ring: August 24, 2017	Emoji 5.0 support; Chinese Lunar calendar support in Calendar app
10.0.15245	Fast ring: August 25, 2017	
10.0.15250	Fast ring: September 12, 2017	
10.0.15252	Fast ring: September 15, 2017 Slow ring: September 22, 2017	

== See also ==
- Windows 10 PC version history
- Windows Phone version history
