= Berkeley Softworks =

Software development company (1983–2003)

GeoWorks Corporation
- Logo of the company doing business as GeoWorks Corporation
- Formerly: The Softworks (1983–1984); Berkeley Softworks, Inc. (1984–1990)
- Type: Public
- Industry: Software
- Founded: 1983; 43 years ago in Berkeley, California
- Founder: Brian P. Dougherty
- Defunct: 2003; 23 years ago
- Fate: Dissolution
- Products: GEOS, PC/GEOS, geoRAM, geoPublish, geoProgrammer, geoFile, geoCalc

Berkeley Softworks, Inc., later GeoWorks Corporation, was an American software-development company founded by American computing engineer and former Mattel employee Brian P. Dougherty in 1983. It is best known for its GEOS and PC/GEOS operating systems, the latter also known as GeoWorks Ensemble or simply GeoWorks. The company ceased operations in 2003 after it was bought by various other companies. In the early 1990s, Microsoft's Bill Gates attempted to acquire the company to incorporate features of PC/GEOS into Microsoft Windows.

== History ==
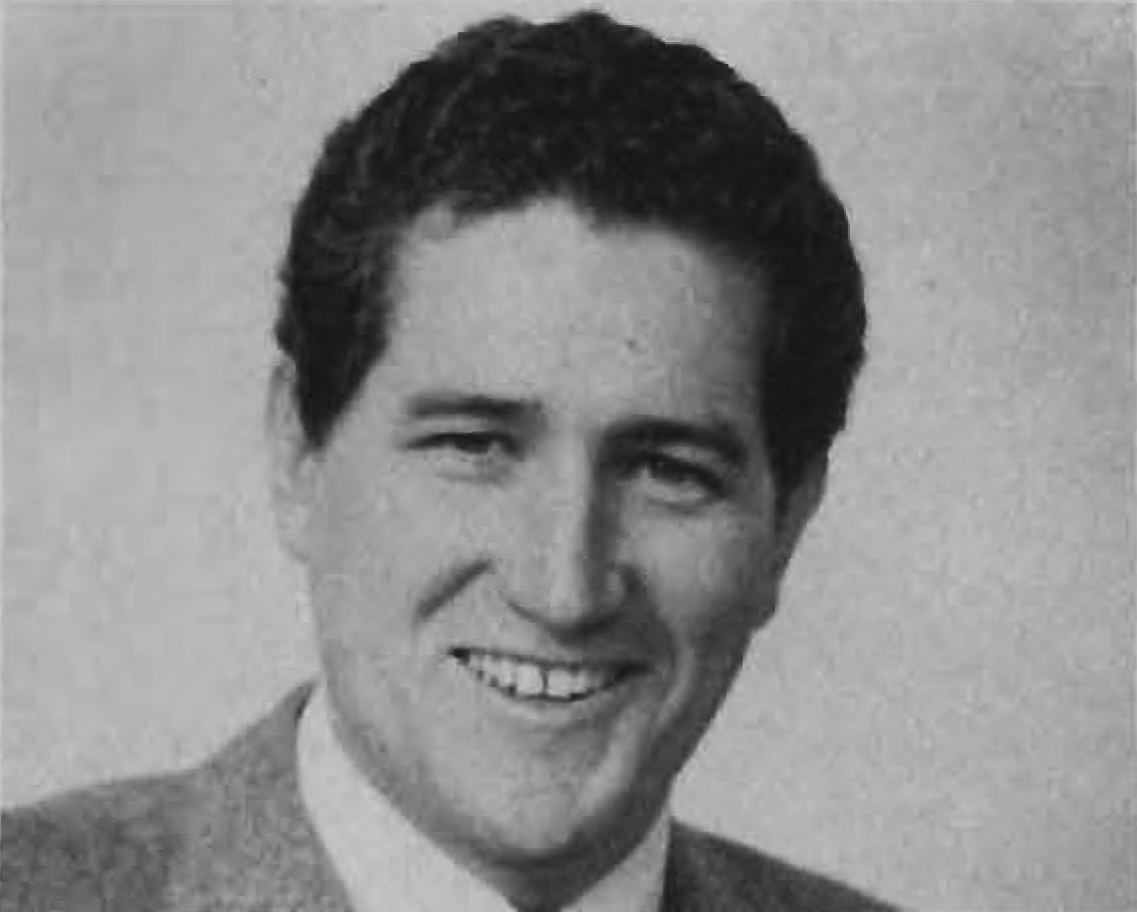
Brian P. Dougherty, founder of Berkeley Softworks, pictured in 1987

Berkeley Softworks, Inc., was founded in Berkeley, California, by Brian P. Dougherty in 1983 as The Softworks. Before starting his company, Dougherty—a graduate of UC Berkeley—had previously co-founded Imagic, a video game developer and publisher based in Los Gatos, California, in 1981. Imagic was founded by ex-employees of Mattel Electronics (of which Dougherty was one) and Atari, Inc. Founded with $2 million of venture capital, Imagic was initially successful but collapsed in the wake of the 1983 video game market crash. By comparison, Berkeley Softworks was founded with no capital beyond the $100,000 in net worth after having exited Imagic. He incorporated The Softworks two blocks away from his alma mater. In 1984, the company changed its name to Berkeley Softworks and began releasing its first products, mostly games for home computers such as the Apple II, the Commodore 64, and the IBM Personal Computer, as well as video game consoles such as the ColecoVision and the Sega Master System. Many of the company's employees were recent students of UC Berkeley who took semesters off to earn money in between their studies. Dougherty described employee turnover rate in 1988 as low, with no offers to join the company's technical staff turned down and no employee leaving of their own volition.

In 1985, the company began development of a graphical operating system intended to extend the lifespan of the Commodore 64, which industry analysts were beginning to see as increasingly obsoleted by the IBM's line of PCs and Apple's Macintosh. This operating system project was eventually realized as GEOS, released in 1986 for the Commodore 64 and Commodore 128. GEOS received glowing reviews at the 1986 Consumer Electronics Show and sold in great numbers. The meteoric growth of the company led to stresses on its finances and customer service department. In June 1987, the company hired Dennis Rowland, a then-recent MBA graduate from Harvard, to be Berkeley Softworks' chief operating officer.

In 1988, the company released GEOS for the Apple II, providing this microcomputer with its first graphical operating system. The company soon after released applications for GEOS for the Commodore and Apple II, including geoFile (a database application), geoPublish (a desktop publishing suite), and geoCalc (a spreadsheet application). The success of these applications on the Apple II convinced Apple to develop a graphical office suite of their own, AppleWorks GS, in the late 1980s.

Logo of Berkeley Softworks from c. 1983 to 1993

Dougherty had realized the growing influence of the IBM PC on the personal computer market in the mid-1980s and spurred development of GEOS for the IBM PC in 1986. The company renamed itself to GeoWorks Corporation in 1990 and released version 1.0 of GEOS for the IBM PC in 1991. The GEOS product for the PC was later renamed to GEOS Ensemble. Initially receiving positive reviews in the technology press, GEOS Ensemble found itself unable to compete with the growing hegemony of Microsoft's Windows and was faced with complaints from software vendors finding developing for Ensemble difficult, owing to a lack of an SDK. Before the company could publish a complete SDK for their recent Ensemble 2.0 in 1992, however, Windows 3.1 had almost completely dominated the operating systems market for IBM PCs and compatibles. The company halted advertisements of GEOS Ensemble in computer magazines and largely retreated from the personal computer market by the end of 1993.

GeoWorks found reprieve in the handheld PC and PDA market, releasing several embedded version of GEOS for devices such as the Tandy Zoomer as well as products from AST Research, Canon, and Sharp Electronics. In 1994, GeoWorks completed its initial public offering, offering 1.5 million shares of common stock and infusing the company with capital to keep it afloat. Shortly after its IPO, the company formed partnerships with Hewlett-Packard and Novell to provide products for their systems and vice versa.

GeoWorks licensed Ensemble to NewDeal in 1996, a company based in Somerville, Massachusetts, founded by ex-employees of GeoWorks (née Berkeley Softworks). Their incarnation of the product, named NewDeal Office, was offered for older PCs whose processors could not run the latest versions of Windows (then Windows 95, Windows 98, and Windows ME) fast enough.

GeoWorks effectively dissolved in 2003, selling off its United Kingdom operations to Teleca Ltd of Sweden that year and seeking bankruptcy protection in the United States around the same time.

== Attempted acquisition by Microsoft, Apple, and Sun Microsystems ==
At the beginning of the 1990s, Brian P. Dougherty was called by Microsoft's then-CEO Bill Gates to discuss incorporating features of PC/GEOS into Windows, such as the start menu which PC/GEOS had 2½ years before Windows did. Gates also wanted to move the development team to Seattle. However the team was not interested in moving and the lead VC advised against this.

He Bill Gates was actually very charming. Ballmer was the hammer. I met with Bill and several of the engineers on the Windows development team first, it turns out that several of those engineers were in another small Berkeley company with Nathan Myhrvold that Microsoft had acquired earlier. They were complimentary of what we had done and talked about joining forces to work on the next version of Windows. I should have listened to them, especially considering how MS stock appreciated from 1989 on.

Ballmer was the bad cop, he came in and said, "Look if you don't sell or license to us, we really have to crush you, we can't afford to have a competing PC operating system". I don't think he was trying to be mean or intimidating; it was just matter of fact. As I look back on it, if I were in his or Gates shoes I would have had the same attitude. The PC OS standard was a winner-take-all sweepstakes with billions of dollars hanging in the balance, the world doesn't really want to have to write software for multiple OSes.

A lot of people vanquished by Microsoft cry about their unfair business practices, I look at it differently; they were there first and fought tooth and nail to defend their business. I'd have done the same in their place.

— Brian P. Dougherty, 2006

At around the same time, GeoWorks got into extensive discussions with Apple about developing a low-cost notebook laptop which would run GEOS but with a modified Macintosh UI. The idea got to the point that it was presented to then Apple CEO John Sculley. The idea was scrapped in favour of producing Macintosh PowerBooks with MacOS. At one point the development team wrote a version of PC/GEOS that was able to run a user interface which was almost indistinguishable from the Mac UI – one could go into preferences and select either the "Mac UI" or "Motif UI" (which was the name for a Windows-like UI): after selecting a UI preference the system would then restart itself and the applications on the computer would show up in whatever style of UI you chose. Brian said that "You almost have to see this live to believe how cool it was."

Brian had also stated that the object-oriented user interface of PC/GEOS is to this day the most sophisticated GUI technology ever to be built in an operating system. GeoWorks Corporation accused the Java development team at Sun Microsystems of studying GeoWorks and stealing some of the concepts from the user interface.
