= Super 1750 Clone =

The Super 1750 Clone was a 512 kB RAM expansion unit designed as a tiny, but compatible, third-party replacement for Commodore's then out-of-production CBM 1750 REU. Manufactured by Chip Level Designs, the Super 1750 Clone was sold by Software Support International.

- Used the same MOS 8726 REC (RAM Expansion Controller) chip as the Commodore REUs.
- Worked on the C128 and the C64.
- Rather than 16 chips of 256K×1-bit DRAMs, it used four 256K×4-bit DRAMs (in ZIP packages). This gave several advantages over Commodore's original REUs:
  - Less power consumption, so did not require the C64 to be upgraded with a heavy-duty power supply to use it.
  - Much smaller; the plastic case was the same type used by the Epyx FastLoad cartridge.
