= Commodore 1351 =

Computer mouse made in 1986

The Commodore 1351 is a computer mouse made by Commodore in 1986, which can be directly plugged into the 9-pin control port of a Commodore 64 or 128.

== Description ==
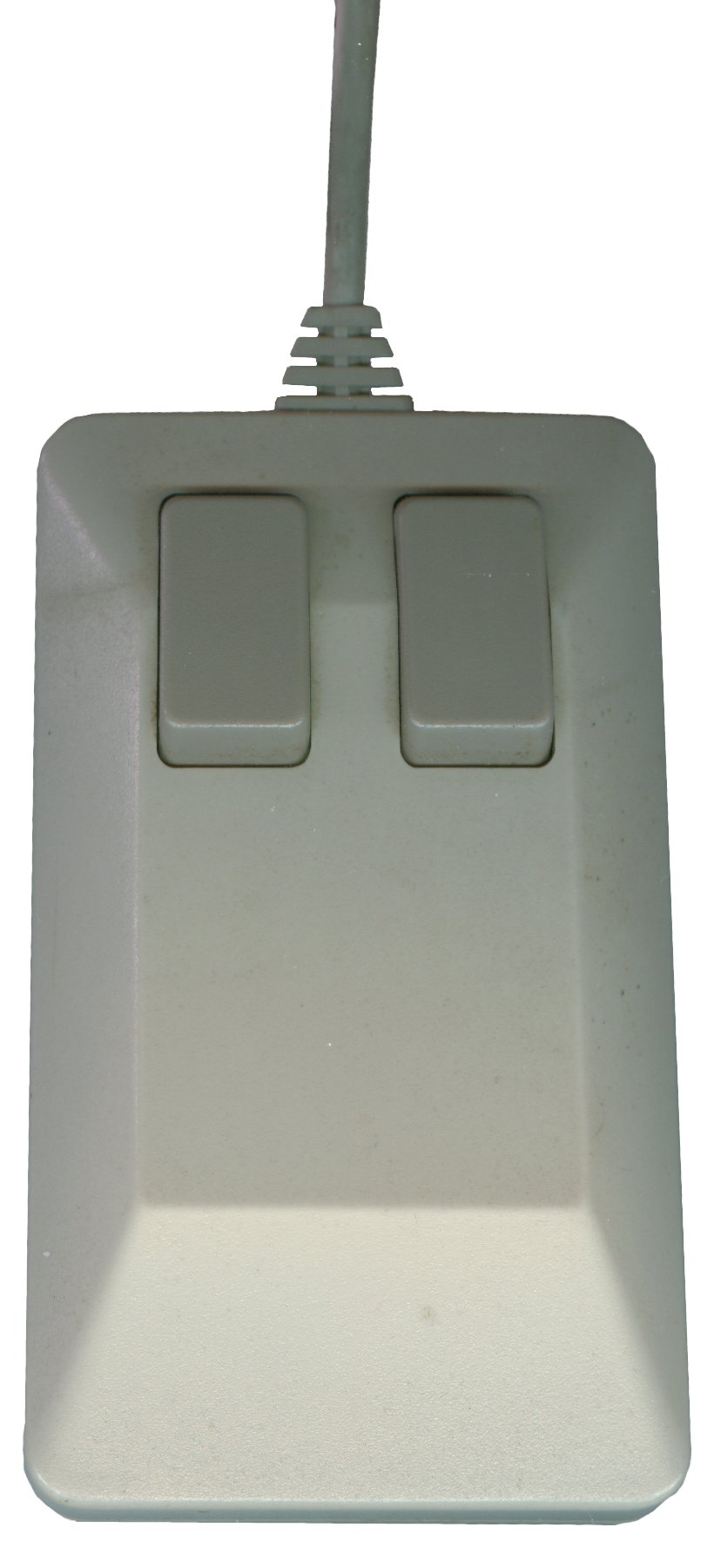
A Commodore mouse, either type 1350 or 1351

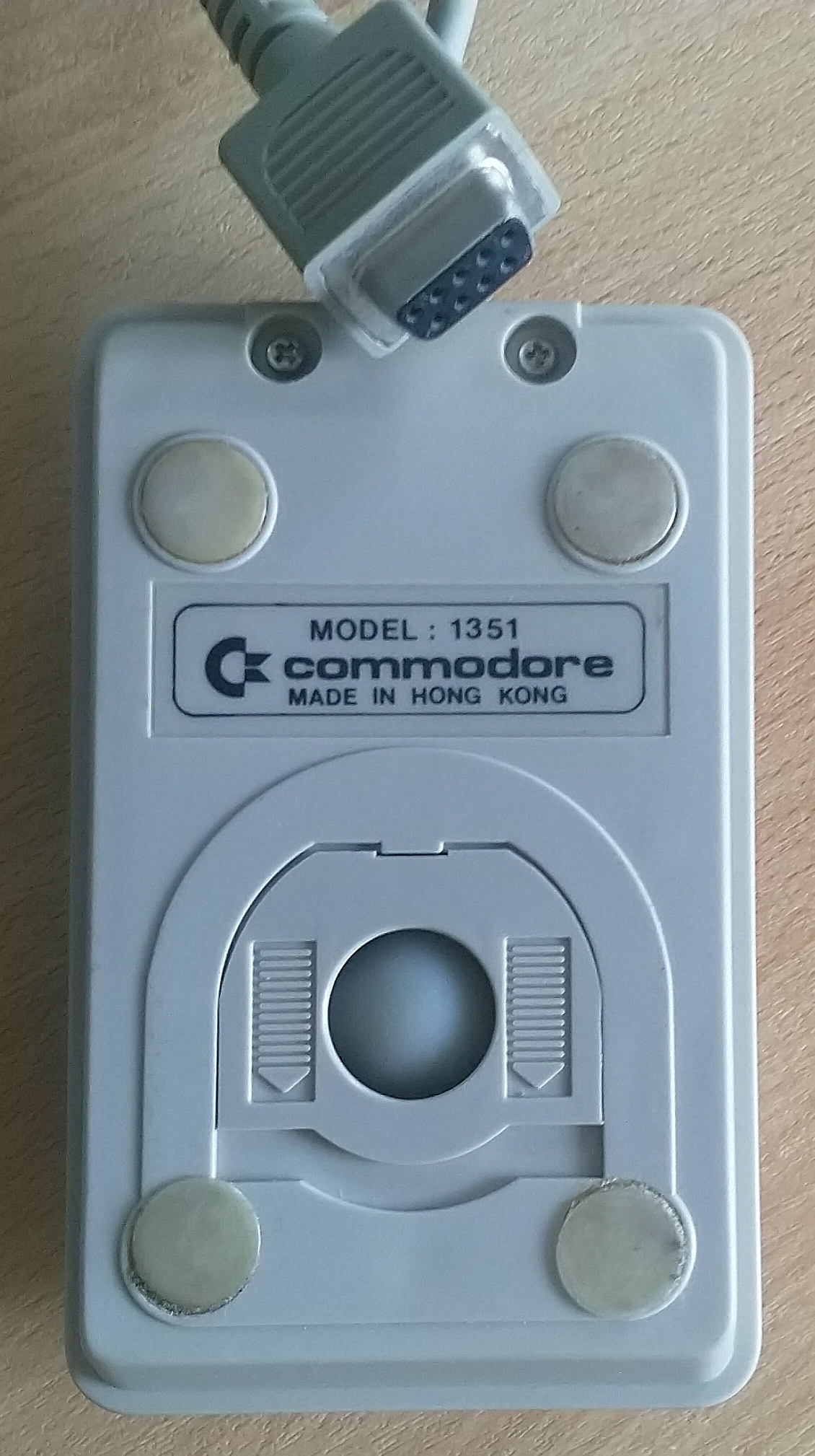
Bottom side and connector of a Commodore 1351

The Commodore 1351 is similar in appearance to the mouse supplied with Amiga computers of the time, but the two are not mutually compatible. In its default mode, it is a true proportional mouse, but by holding down the right mouse button when powering up the machine, it can be made to emulate its predecessor, the 1350 (which while physically a mouse acted electrically like a joystick).

The 1351 utilizes the 6581/8580 SID chip's analog-to-digital converter, thus it is only compatible with the C64/C128 and will not work on the VIC-20 despite using the same 9-pin connector. An Amiga mouse, although electrically compatible with the C64, uses the paddle registers and will be much more CPU-intensive to read than the 1351. A few programs such as Interpaint support Amiga mice.

The mouse was distributed with a user manual containing maintenance instructions, pinouts, and sample BASIC and machine language programs for the Commodore 64 and 128. Also included was a diskette containing diagnostic tools, demos, drivers, and an upgrade for the GEOS operating system.

The first mouse released for the C64 was the NEOS Mouse in 1985 by the company Nihon Electronics Co. Ltd., however it was quickly superseded when Commodore introduced their own mouse the following year. A handful of drawing programs, GEOS, and the C64 port of Arkanoid can use the NEOS Mouse.

== Reception ==
The 1351 was favorably reviewed by The Transactor, which praised the unit's ergonomic design and tactile feedback and the quality of the accompanying documentation. The reviewer noted that, at the time of writing, very little commercial software supported the 1351 in proportional mode, but suggested that the mouse would be of benefit in joystick mode in drawing programs, font and sprite editors, and certain kinds of games.

Software that can use a 1351 mouse includes GEOS, The Faery Tale Adventure, Operation Wolf, and assorted application/drawing programs.
