= Samsung ZEQ 9000 =

Planned smartphone

The Samsung ZEQ 9000 (product code: SM-Z9000 for the single SIM, and SM-Z9005 for dual SIM) was planned to be the first Tizen smartphone to be released commercially by Samsung. It was announced at MWC 2014.

This trademark was denied in both US and Korea for the moment. It was believed that the a product heading to selected markets (Russia, UK and France) is SM-Z910F, but then later conflicting reports say there are no release plans for Samsung SM-Z910F.

== Known specifications ==
4.8 inch screen with WXGA (768×1280) resolution and a 2.3 GHz quad-core Snapdragon 800 processor.
