= GeoPublish =

Desktop publishing program

geoPublish
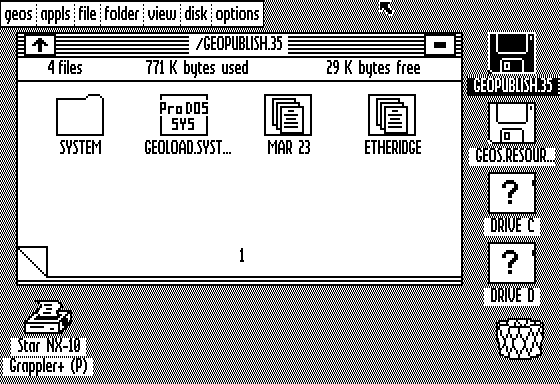
- GeoPublish on Apple II
- Developer(s): Berkeley Softworks
- Initial release: 1986; 39 years ago
- Operating system: GEOS
- Type: desktop publishing

geoPublish is a discontinued desktop publishing program made by Berkeley Softworks for their GEOS Operating System.

geoPublish brought proper Desktop Publishing to the Commodore 64. With Left and Right Master Pages page layout work was simplified with the ability to work on the full page at once. Other features included autoflow text placement, the ability to create 16-page documents (with page numbering up to 256 to facilitate chaining documents), a suite of object-oriented drawing tools, and the ability to scale fonts from 4-192 points. geoPublish is capable of outputting PostScript page descriptions to laser printers and is used for creating posters, newsletters, and even books.

== Versions ==
A version for the Commodore 64 was released in 1986. It was ported to the Apple II in 1988. Version 2.0 was released in 1993.
