= GEOS (16-bit operating system) =

Graphical operating system (16-bit)

PC/GEOS
- A screenshot of Breadbox Ensemble 4.1.2
- Developer: Berkeley Softworks
- Written in: Assembly, C
- Working state: Supported
- Source model: Open source, formerly closed source
- Initial release: November 1990; 35 years ago
- Latest release: 4.1.3 / 25 August 2009; 17 years ago
- Repository: github.com/bluewaysw
- Influenced by: GEOS (8-bit)
- Default user interface: Motif or "Win95 clone"
- License: Apache
- Official website: blog.bluewaysw.de

GEOS (later renamed GeoWorks Ensemble, NewDeal Office, and Breadbox Ensemble) is a computer operating environment, graphical user interface (GUI), and suite of application software. Originally released as PC/GEOS, it runs on MS-DOS-based, IBM PC compatible computers. Versions for some handheld platforms were also released and licensed to some companies.

PC/GEOS was first created by Berkeley Softworks, which later became GeoWorks Corporation. Version 4.0, renamed Breadbox Ensemble, was developed in 2001 by Breadbox Computer Company LLC, In 2015, Frank Fischer, the CEO of Breadbox, died, and efforts on the operating system stopped until later in 2017 when it was bought by blueway.Softworks.

PC/GEOS should not be confused with the 8-bit GEOS product from the same company, which runs on the Commodore 64 and Apple II.

== PC/GEOS ==
=== GeoWorks Ensemble ===
In November 1990, GeoWorks (formerly Berkeley Softworks) released PC/GEOS for IBM PC compatible systems. Commonly referred to as GeoWorks Ensemble, it was incompatible with the earlier 8-bit versions of GEOS for Commodore and Apple II computers, but provided numerous enhancements, including scalable fonts and multitasking on IBM PC XT- and AT-class PC clones. GeoWorks saw a market opportunity to provide a graphical user interface for the 16 million older-model PCs that were unable to run Microsoft Windows 2.x.

GEOS was packaged with a suite of productivity applications. Each had a name prefixed by "Geo": GeoWrite, GeoDraw, GeoManager, GeoPlanner, GeoDex, and GeoComm. It was also bundled with many PCs at the time, but like other GUI environments for the PC platform, such as Graphics Environment Manager (GEM), it ultimately proved less successful in the marketplace than Windows. Former CEO of GeoWorks claims that GEOS faded away "because Microsoft threatened to withdraw supply of MS-DOS to hardware manufacturers who bundled Geoworks with their machines".

In December 1992, NEC and Sony bundled an original equipment manufacturer (OEM) version of GeoWorks named the CD Manager with their respective CD-ROM players that sold as retail box add-on peripherals for consumers. The NEC Bundle retailed for around $500 with a 1x external CD-ROM, Small Computer System Interface (SCSI) interface controller, Labtec CD-150 amplified stereo speakers and 10 software titles.

A scaled-down version of GeoWorks was used by America Online for their MS-DOS-based AOL client software from the time of its introduction on IBM compatible PCs until the late 1990s when America Online dropped development for graphical DOS in favor of Microsoft Windows. AOL's early distribution disks essentially included a barebones version of GeoWorks, allowing modem owners to access the environment without purchasing it separately. IBM released the PC/GEOS-based EduQuest SchoolView network management tool for K-12 schools in 1994. Negotiations to make PC/GEOS an integral part of PC DOS 7.0 failed.

GeoWorks attempted to get third-party developers but was unable to get much support due to expense of the developer kit, which cost $1,000 for the manuals only, and the difficult programming environment, which required a second PC networked via serial port to run the debugger.

Even though PC/GEOS is referred to as an "operating system", it still requires DOS in load. GEOS and its applications were written in a mix of 8086 assembly language (Espire), an interpreted language called IZL, and C (GEOS Object C: GOC) with non-standard language extensions to support the object-oriented design.

Under DR DOS 6.0, if TASKMAX was loaded before PC/GEOS, PC/GEOS registered as graphical menu system for TASKMAX. This still worked under the pre-emptive multitasker (EMM386 /MULTI + TASKMGR) provided by Novell DOS 7, OpenDOS 7.01 and DR-DOS 7.02 (and higher), allowing for multiple GEOS and DOS applications to run concurrently.

After the release of Ensemble 2.01, GeoWorks ended support for the desktop version to focus on handhelds and smart devices.

Geoworks Ensemble won the 1991 Software Publishers Association Excellence in Software Award for Best Consumer Program.

=== NewDeal Office ===
A newer version of PC/GEOS was marketed in the late 1990s as NewDeal Office from NewDeal Inc. in hopes of creating a market among owners of i386, i486, and Pentium PCs that could not run Windows 95 or Windows 98 effectively. NewDeal released three new versions of NewDeal Office (NewDeal Office 2.5, NewDeal Office 3/98 and NewDeal Office 2000) until it went bankrupt in 2000. NDO or NDO 2000 came with a web browser named Skipper or Skipper 2000, respectively.

=== Breadbox Ensemble ===
After "NewDeal Inc." went out of business, Breadbox purchased the rights in the software from GeoWorks in 2001. Their newest PC/GEOS, 4.x, is now a full productivity and internet suite, including web browser (named WebMagick) as well as email. Other essential programs such as word processing, spreadsheet, flat file database and graphics applications are integrated into this package.

On 14 November 2015, Frank S. Fischer, the CEO and owner of Breadbox Ensemble LLC, died of a heart attack, some time after announcing plans to bring GEOS to Android.

=== Versions ===
- 1990: OS/90 beta version
- 1990: geoDOS beta version
- 1990: GeoWorks 1.0
- 1991: GeoWorks 1.2
- 1992: GeoWorks 1.2 Pro (with Borland Quattro Pro for DOS with PC/GEOS "Look and Feel")
- 1992: GeoWorks DTP
- 1992: GeoWorks CD Manager
- 1993: GeoWorks Ensemble 2.0 (new kernel PC/GEOS 2.0)
- 1993: Geopublish 2.0
- 1994: Geoworks Ensemble 2.01
- 1996: NewDeal Office 2.2
- 1996: NewDeal Office 2.5
- 1996: NewDeal Publish 2.5 shareware version
- 1997: NewDeal Office 97
- 1998: NewDeal Office 98
- 1999: NewDeal Office release 3 (new kernel PC/GEOS 3.0)
- 1999: NewDeal Office release 3 evaluation
- 1999: NewDeal Office 3.2
- 2000: NewDeal Office 3.2d (German patch)
- 2000: NewDeal Office 2000 (new kernel PC/GEOS 4.0)
- 2000: NewDeal Office 2000 for GlobalPC (for a Surf´n´Office PC from Ted Turner IV (MyTurn, Inc.) with help from CNN)
- 2001: BreadBox Ensemble beta version 4.0.1.1
- 2001: BreadBox Ensemble beta version 4.0.1.x
- 2002: Breadbox Ensemble beta version 4.0.2.0
- 2005–March: Breadbox Ensemble version 4.1.0.0
- 2005–November: Breadbox Ensemble version 4.1.2.0
- 2009–August: Breadbox Ensemble version 4.1.3.0

== PEN/GEOS ==
PEN/GEOS 1.0 was the new name for PC/GEOS 2.0 when GeoWorks released it on 9 April 1992. PEN/GEOS 1.0 was a pioneering personal digital assistant (PDA) technology. GEOS was also used in the low-end GeoBook laptop from Brother Industries and in several Nokia Communicator models (GEOS 3.0 in models 9000, 9110). PEN/GEOS 2.0 was released in 1992, and version 3.0 was released in 1995.

=== Zoomer devices; Tandy Z-PDA, AST GRiDPad 2390, Casio Z-7000 & XL 7000 ===
PEN/GEOS 1.0 was used as the operating system for the Tandy Corporation Z-PDA, which was introduced shortly after the first Apple Newton MessagePad. Palm Computing had been incorporated to create software for this device and shipped its first handwriting recognition software, PalmPrint, personal information manager, Palm Organizer, and synchronization software, PalmConnect, on the Z-PDA. Palm Organizer included the PalmSchedule datebook, PalmAddress address book, PalmNotes notebook, a dictionary, calculator, clock, forms calculator, 26 language translation dictionary, on-line help, holiday, and travel information. The device was also sold under license as the AST GRiDPad 2390 and as the Casio Z-7000 which was the best-selling version. In the US, Casio sold it under the name XL-7000 without the multilingual interface, but added an AOL client and some US-specific help files. These devices were all named Zoomer and were the first PDAs with a connection to the online services CompuServe and AOL. This was made possible through the preinstalled dial-up software CompuServeAOL.

=== HP OmniGo 100 & 120 ===
In 1993, GeoWorks released PEN/GEOS 2.0, again based on PC/GEOS 2.0. In 1995, this version of GEOS appeared (running on top of DOS) on the HP OmniGo 100. It featured Graffiti handwriting recognition. The OmniGo is a flip-around clamshell handheld computer powered by a Vadem VG230 integrated PC-on-a-chip. The VG230 chip includes an Intel 80186-instruction set compatible NEC V30 core. It was soon followed by the HP OmniGo 120, which added a high-contrast screen.

=== Brother LW-Writing System ===
Brother LW-screen typewriters use PEN/GEOS and are the only version of the operating system that ships with vendor-provided drivers for scanner and it included a GEOS scanning application. In Germany, the Brother LW750ic system is equipped with PEN/GEOS.

=== Brother GeoBook ===
In 1997, Brother, in collaboration with IBM, brought the GeoBook series of notebooks to market. GeoBook models NB-60, NB-80C, and PN-9100GR used a modified version of PEN/GEOS using the Yago user interface. The GeoBook series was marketed mainly in education and was part of the IBM Eduquest School View strategy.

=== Nokia Communicator 9000(i) and 9110(i) ===
In 1996, the Nokia 9000 Communicator smartphone was introduced. This phone uses PEN/GEOS 3.0 and established the smartphone market. Nokia followed up with Communicator models 9000i, 9110, and 9110i.

== GEOS-SC ==
GEOS-SC was a 32-bit reduced instruction set computer (RISC) CPU smartphone, OS, and GUI for the Japanese cellphone market. It was released in 1997. Originally built as GeoWorks' planned future OS and codenamed 'Liberty', GEOS-SC became the basis for cellphones designed by Mitsubishi Electric Company (MELCO) of Japan.

== GEOS-SE ==
Alongside this, GEOS-SE which was an OS designed and developed by Eden Ltd., a UK-based company acquired in 1997 by Geoworks. It became the basis of several other devices, most notably the Seiko Epson Locatio which was a multifunction device incorporating browser, PIM software, phone, GPS and Camera. It was launched in Japan in 1998.

== FreeGEOS ==
Since 2016, the source code of PC/GEOS has been made available as FreeGEOS and can be compiled and edited freely.
