= GeoRAM =

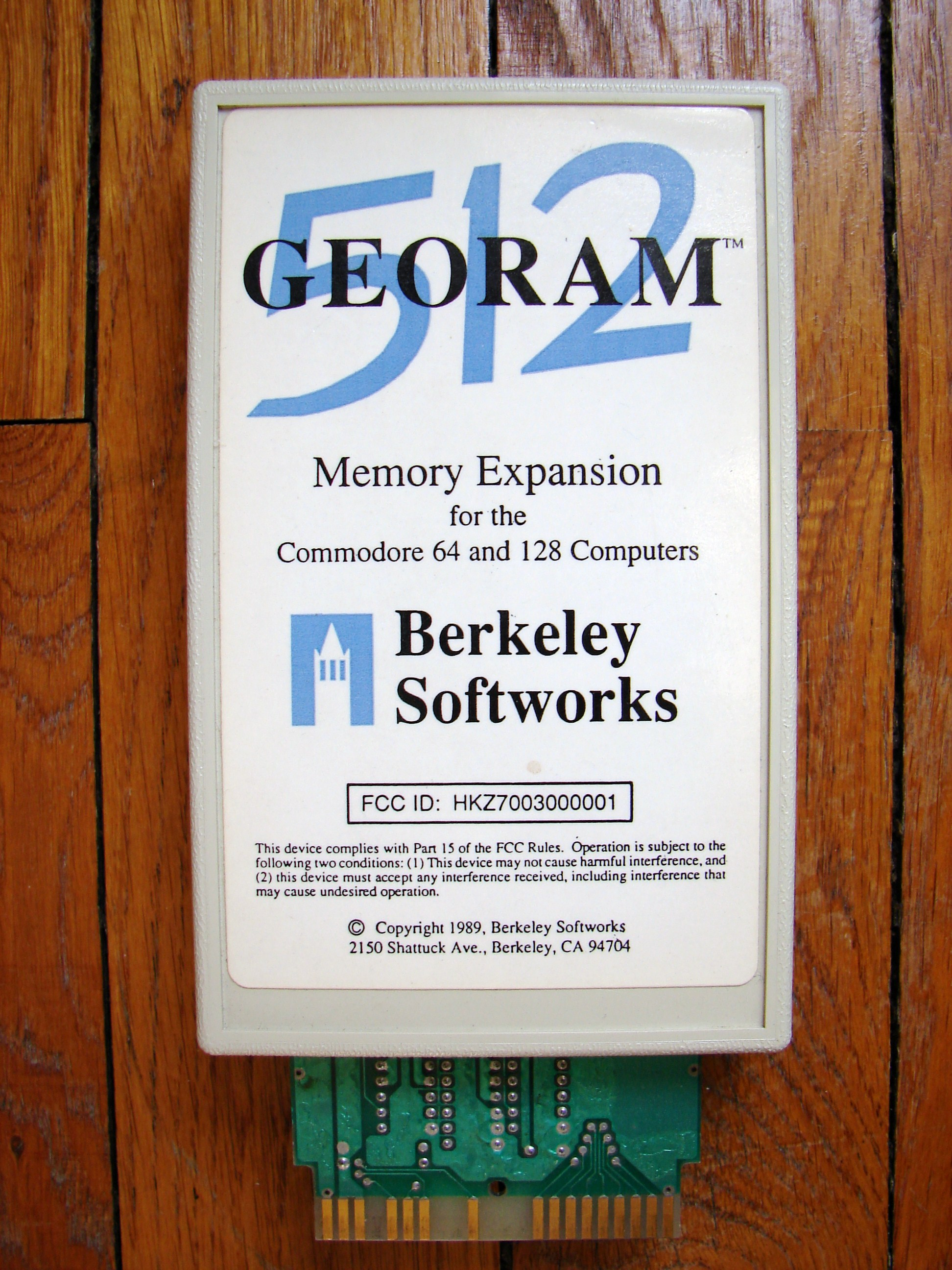
geoRAM memory expansion peripheral

geoRAM is a discontinued memory expansion unit designed to work with the Commodore 64 and the 128 computers. GeoRAM was specifically designed to work with the GEOS operating system. geoRAM was created by Dave Durran.

During the chip shortages of the 1980s, Commodore could not produce enough of its RAM Expansion Units (they eventually cancelled them). The GEOS operating system relied heavily on extra RAM and so the company behind GEOS produced their own memory expansion cartridge, called the geoRAM.

By using a mapped-in page scheme, RAM contents on the cartridge are directly accessible by the CPU, and don't rely on DMA like the REU cartridges, which enable memory transfers between system RAM and REU much faster than the system CPU can do. Hence, there's no other benefit than extra RAM, and not much software other than GEOS actually supported it.
