= Durango F-85 =

Early personal computer by Durango Systems Corporation

- Logo of Durango Systems
- Manufacturer: Durango Systems Corporation
- Type: Personal business computer
- Released: September 1978
- Lifespan: 1978-1984
- Media: two 100 tpi high-capacity 5.25-inch diskette drives storing 480 KB on each single-sided or 960 KB on double-sided diskettes using group-coded recording (GCR)
- Operating system: DX-85M (multi-user/multitasking)
- CPU: 5 MHz Intel 8085A
- Memory: 65 KB (up to 196 KB)
- Storage: 40 MB Shugart SA-4006 14-inch winchester, later 5.25" integrated ST506-interface MFM drive
- Display: 9-inch CRT with 64 characters per row by 16 rows or 80 characters per row by 24, based on the Intel 8275 Video display controller
- Input: keyboard, full stroke, 84 key
- Successor: Durango "Poppy"

The Durango F-85 was an early personal computer introduced in September 1978 by Durango Systems Corporation, a company started in 1977 by George E. Comstock, John M. Scandalios and Charles L. Waggoner, all formerly of Diablo Systems. The F-85 could run its own multitasking operating system called DX-85M, which included an integral Indexed Sequential (ISAM) file system and per-task file locking, or alternatively CP/M-80. DX-85M used a text configuration file named CONFIG.SYS five years before this filename was used for a similar purpose under MS-DOS/PC DOS 2.0 in 1983.

The F-85 used single-sided 5¼-inch 100 tpi diskette drives providing 480 KB using a high-density 4/5 group coded encoding. The machine was using a Western Digital FD1781 floppy-disk controller with 77-track Micropolis drives. In later models this was expanded to a double-sided option for 960 KB (946/947 KB formatted (Note: The product flyer for the Durango 800 series documents a formatted "on-line capacity" of 1.892 MB for the diskette drives. The system, however, was equipped with two 5¼-inch Micropolis 100 tpi 77-track floppy drives by default, and 1.892 MB is about twice as large as the physical drive capacity documented in various other sources (480 KB per side), therefore, by "on-line capacity" they must have meant the available storage capacity available to users for the combination of two drives.)) per diskette.

Durango later dropped the "F-85" model name and adopted a user model system, with 700 being the entry model and 950 being the full-featured model.

Still later, they designed a 80186-/80286-based 16-bit system, the Durango "Poppy"; MS-DOS was selected as the entry operating system.

== See also ==
- Group coded recording
