= Floppy disk controller =

Circuitry that controls reading from and writing to a computer's floppy disk drive

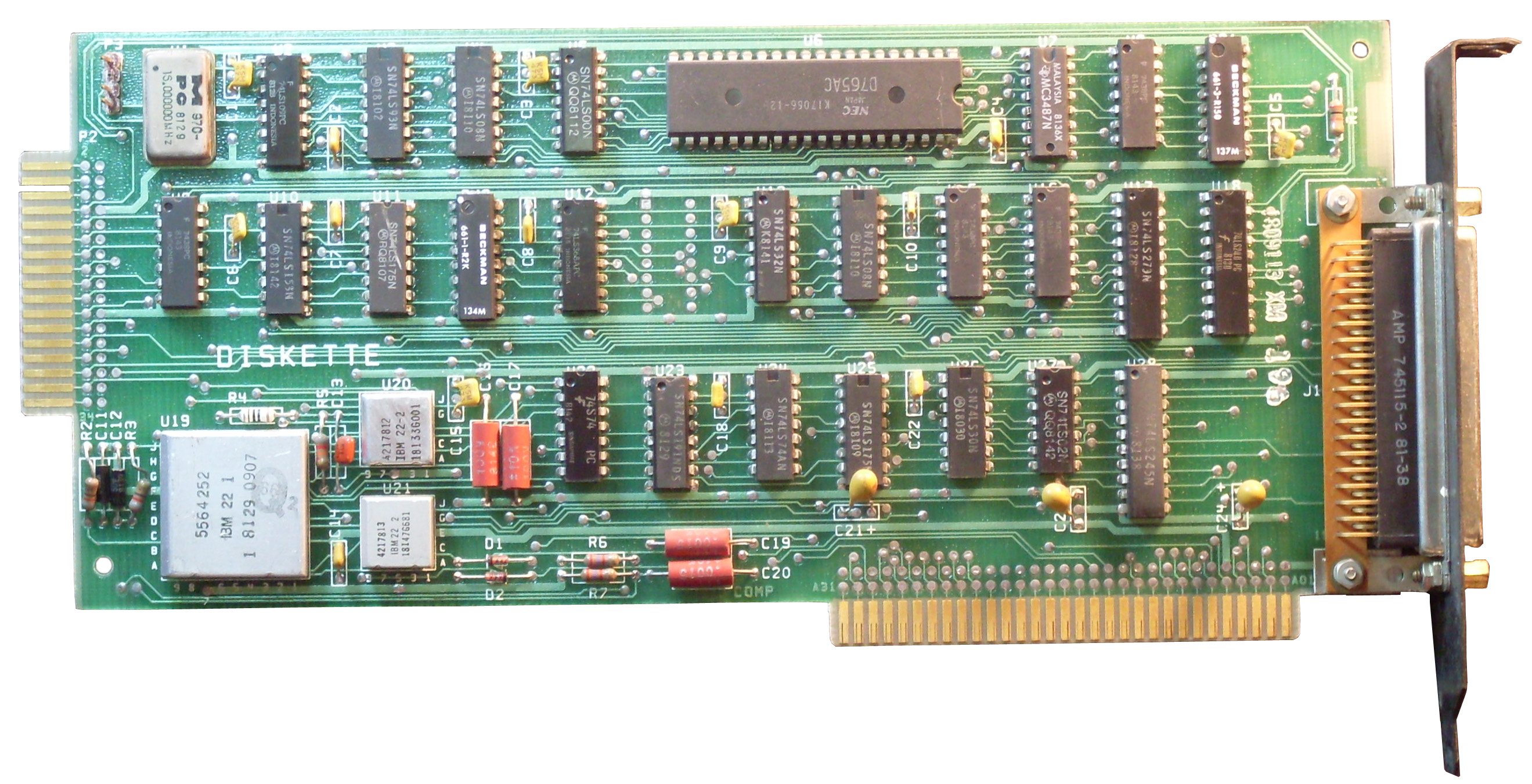
FDC board from an IBM 5150. The NEC D765AC FDC IC is the large dual in-line package at the top.

A floppy disk controller (FDC) is a hardware component that directs and controls reading from and writing to a computer's floppy disk drive (FDD). It has evolved from a discrete set of components on one or more circuit boards to a special-purpose integrated circuit (IC or "chip") or a component thereof. An FDC is responsible for reading data presented from the host computer and converting it to the drive's on-disk format using one of a number of encoding schemes, like FM encoding (single density) or MFM encoding (double density), and reading those formats and returning it to its original binary values.

Depending on the platform, data transfers between the controller and host computer would be controlled by the computer's own microprocessor, or an inexpensive dedicated microprocessor like the MOS 6507 or Zilog Z80. Early controllers required additional circuitry to perform specific tasks like providing clock signals and setting various options. Later designs included more of this functionality on the controller and reduced the complexity of the external circuitry; single-chip solutions were common by the later 1980s.

By the 1990s, the floppy disk was increasingly giving way to hard drives, which required similar controllers. In these systems, the controller also often combined a microcontroller to handle data transfer over standardized connectors like SCSI and IDE that could be used with any computer. In more modern systems, the FDC, if present at all, is typically part of the many functions provided by a single super I/O chip.

== History ==
The first floppy disk drive controller (FDC) like the first floppy disk drive (the IBM 23FD) shipped in 1971 as a component in the IBM 2385 Storage Control Unit for the IBM 2305 fixed head disk drive, and of the System 370 Models 155 and 165. The IBM 3830 Storage Control Unit, a contemporaneous and quite similar controller, uses its internal processor to control a 23FD. The resultant FDC is a simple implementation in IBMs' MST hybrid circuits on a few printed circuit cards. The drive, FDC and media were proprietary to IBM and although other manufacturers provided early FDDs prior to 1973 there were no standards for FDCs, drives or media.

IBM's 1973 introduction of the 3740 Data Entry System created the basic media standard for the 8-inch single sided floppy disk, IBM's "Type 1" diskette, which coupled with rapidly increasing requirements for inexpensive, removable direct access storage for many small applications caused a dramatic growth in drive and controller shipments.

Prior to the introduction of special purpose integrated circuit versions, most FDCs consisted of at least one printed circuit implemented with 40 or more ICs. Examples of such FDCs include:

- 1973: The FDC in IBM's 3741 is a type of microcontroller that accepts commands from the system's microprocessor ("MPU" in IBM's terminology) and executes them on the attached 33FD as independently as possible. It accepts and executes the following commands, select/stop, write check, seek lower, seek higher, read data, read I D, write data, write control, write I D, set ready, reset access counter, and nothing (no-op). It was implemented using IBM's MST hybrid circuits on the motherboard plus a separate data separator (VFO) PCB. This IBM FDC did establish the IBM Type 1 diskette as the first industry standard floppy disk medium but neither its interface to the host microprocessor nor its interface to the 33FD were adopted as industry standards.
- 1974: iCOM's FD360 contained an early FDC, the CF 360, that generated industry standard media, connected to industry standard host busses, and supported industry standard FDDs. Its FDC was implemented on a PCB approximately 12x9 inches as a state machine using 30 ICs.
- 1976: Scientific Micro Systems' FD0300 FDC built on an 8-inch by 12-inch circuit board contains a microprocessor and approximately 50 integrated circuits and is designed to provide easy attachment to a number of host buses.
- 1976: Shugart Associates introduced the first 5¼-inch floppy disk drive along with an associated and first FDC for this form factor, the SA4400. The SA4400 performs control functions to transfer data between a host system and up to 3 disk drives using an 8-bit general purpose host interface which format disks according to a modified IBM 3740 type media format specifications. The FDC is microprocessor controlled and implemented on a 5.75 by 9.50 inch PCB with 45 ICs. The drive interface and media form factors became industry standards with the media then evolving over time to support a number of different formats.
- 1977: The Apple Disc II FDC, the "Woz Machine", is built with only 8 ICs. It, like the much earlier IBM 3830 FDC, achieved the reduction in components through use of the host processor and firmware. Its interface to the Apple host as well as its interface to the Apple 5¼-inch floppy disk drive is unique and it was not adopted as an industry standard.

The first FDC implemented as a special purpose integrated circuit is the Western Digital FD1771 announced on 19 July 1976. The initial design supported a single format and required additional circuitry but over time, as a family, the design became multi-sourced and evolved to support many formats and minimize external circuitry.

The NEC μPD765 was announced in 1978 and in 1979 NEC introduced the μPD72068, which was software compatible with the μPD765, incorporating a Digital PLL. The μPD765 became a quasi-industry standard when it was adopted in the original IBM PC (1981); the FDC was physically located on its own adapter card along with support circuitry. Other vendors such as Intel produced compatible parts. This design evolved over time into a family offering an almost complete FDC on a chip.

As of March 1986, Sharp had commercialized the FDC LH0110.

In early 1987, Intel introduced the 82072 CHMOS Highly Integrated Floppy Disk Controller for use in industry standard PC computers.

The Intel 82078 series Floppy Disk Controller supports industry standard 82077AA/SL series Floppy Disk Controller. They were available for USD $4-$6 a piece in 1000-unit quantities depending upon these versions.

- 82078-1 both have 44- and 64-leads QFP package. This supports up to 2-Mbyte/sec data transfer rates.
- 82078SL both have 44- and 64-leads QFP package. This features 3.3-volt support and enhanced power management that can power down to less than 50 microamps.

Ultimately in most computer systems the FDC became a part of a Super I/O chip or a Southbridge chip. However, in later motherboards, as floppy disks were phased out by personal computer users, this interface was eliminated. Some manufacturers developed USB-based floppy disk controllers.

== Overview ==
A floppy disk stores binary data not as a series of values, but a series of changes in value. Each of these changes, recorded in the polarity of the magnetic recording media, causes a voltage to be induced in the drive head as the disk surface rotates past it. It is the timing of these polarization changes and the resulting spikes of voltage that encode the ones and zeros of the original data. One of the functions of the controller is to turn the original data into the proper pattern of polarizations during writing, and then recreate it during reads.

As the storage is based on timing, and that timing is easily affected by mechanical and electrical disturbances, accurately reading the data requires some sort of reference signal, the clock. As the on-disk timing is constantly changing, the clock signal has to be provided by the disk itself. To do this, the original data is modified with extra transitions to allow the clock signal to be encoded in the data and then use clock recovery during reads to recreate the original signal. Some controllers require this encoding to be performed externally, but most designs provide standard encodings like FM and MFM.

The controller also provides a number of other services to control the drive mechanism itself. These typically include the movement of the drive head to centre over the separate tracks on the disk, tracking the location of the head and returning it to zero, and sometimes functionally to format a disk based on simple inputs like the number of tracks, sectors per track and number of bytes per sector.

To produce a complete system, the controller has to be combined with additional circuitry or software that acts as a bridge between the controller and the host system. In some systems, like the Apple II and IBM PC, this is controlled by software running on the computer's host microprocessor and the drive interface is connected directly to the processor using an expansion card. On other systems, like the Commodore 64 and Atari 8-bit computers, there is no direct path from the controller to the host CPU and a second processor like the MOS 6507 or Zilog Z80 is used inside the drive for this purpose.

The original Apple II controller was in the form of a plug-in card on the host computer. It could support two drives, and the drives eliminated most of the normal onboard circuitry. This allowed Apple to arrange a deal with Shugart Associates for a simplified drive that lacked most of its normal circuitry. This meant that the combined cost of a single drive and controller card was roughly the same as on other systems, but a second drive could be connected for a smaller additional cost.

The IBM PC took a more conventional approach, their adaptor card could support up to four drives; on the PC direct memory access (DMA) to the drives was performed using DMA channel 2 and IRQ 6. The diagram below shows a conventional floppy disk controller which communicates with the CPU via an Industry Standard Architecture (ISA) bus or similar bus and communicates with the floppy disk drive with a 34 pin ribbon cable. An alternative arrangement that is more usual in recent designs has the FDC included in a super I/O chip which communicates via a Low Pin Count (LPC) bus.

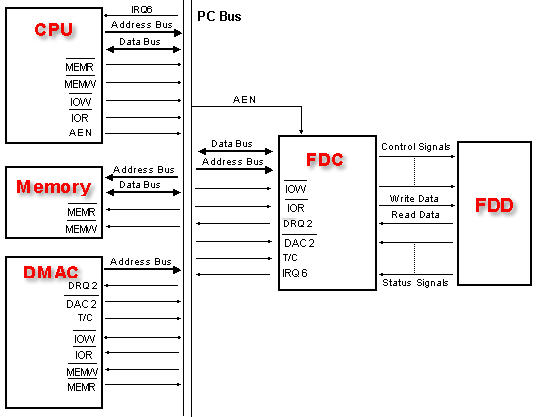
Block diagram showing FDC communication with the CPU and the FDD.

Most of the floppy disk controller (FDC) functions are performed by the integrated circuit but some are performed by external hardware circuits. The list of functions performed by each is given below.

=== Floppy disk controller functions (FDC) ===
- Translate data bits into FM, MFM, M²FM, or GCR format to be able to record them
- Interpret and execute commands such as seek, read, write, format, etc.
- Error detection with checksums generation and verification, like CRC
- Synchronize data with phase-locked loop (PLL)

=== External hardware functions ===
- Selection of which floppy disk drive (FDD) to address
- Switching-on the floppy drive motor
- Reset signal for the floppy controller IC
- Enable/disable interrupt and DMA signals in the floppy disk controller (FDC)
- Data separation logic
- Write pre-compensation logic
- Line drivers for signals to the controller
- Line receivers for signals from the controller

== Input/output ports for common x86-PC controller ==
The FDC has three I/O ports. These are:

- Data port
- Main status register (MSR)
- Digital control port

The first two reside inside the FDC IC while the Control port is in the external hardware. The addresses of these three ports are as follows.

Port Address [hex]	Port Name	Location	Port type
3F5	Data port		Bidirectional I/O
3F4	Main status register	FDC IC	Input
3F2	Digital control port	External hardware	Output

=== Data port ===
This port is used by the software for three different purposes:

- While issuing a command to the FDC IC, command and command parameter bytes are issued to the FDC IC through this port. The FDC IC stores the different parameters and the command in its internal registers.
- After a command is executed, the FDC IC stores a set of status parameters in the internal registers. These are read by the CPU through this port. The different status bytes are presented by the FDC IC in a specific sequence.
- In the programmed and interrupt mode of data transfer, the data port is used for transferring data between the FDC IC and the CPU IN or OUT instruction.

=== Main status register (MSR) ===
This port is used by the software to read the overall status information regarding the FDC IC and the FDD's. Before initiating a floppy disk operation the software reads this port to confirm the readiness condition of the FDC and the disk drives to verify the status of the previously initiated command. The different bits of this register represent :

Bit	Representation
0	FDD 0: Busy in seek mode
1	FDD 1: Busy in seek mode
2	FDD 2: Busy in seek mode
3	FDD 3: Busy in seek mode
4	FDC Busy; Read/Write command in progress
5	Non-DMA mode
6	DIO; Indicates the direction of data transfer between the FDC IC and the CPU
7	MQR; Indicates data register is ready for data transfer

Explanations	
MQR	1 = data register ready, 0 = data register not ready
DIO	1 = controller has data for CPU, 0 = controller expecting data from CPU
Non-DMA	1 = Controller Not in DMA Mode, 0 = Controller in DMA Mode
FDC Busy	1 = Busy, 0 = Not Busy
FDD 0,1,2,3	1 = Running, 0 = Not Running

=== Digital control port ===
This port is used by the software to control certain FDD and FDC IC functions. The bit assignments of this port are:

Bit	Representation
0 and 1	Device number to be selected
2	RESET FDC IC (Low)
3	Enable FDC interrupt and DMA request signals
4 to 7	Turn ON the motor in disk drive 0, 1, 2 or 3 respectively

== Interface to the floppy disk drive ==
A controller connects to one or more drives using a flat ribbon cable, 50 wires for 8" drives and 34 wires for 3.5" & 5.25" drives. A "universal cable" has four drive connectors, two each for 3.5" & 5.25" drives. In the IBM PC family and compatibles, a twist in the cable is used to distinguish disk drives by the socket to which they are connected. All drives are installed with the same drive select address set, and the twist in the cable interchanges the drive select lines at the socket. The drive that is at the far end of the cable would also have a terminating resistor installed to maintain signal quality.

More detailed descriptions of the interface signals including alternative meanings are contained in manufacturer's specifications for drives or host controllers.

When the controller and disk drive are assembled as one device, as it is the case with some external floppy disk drives, e.g., Commodore 1540 and USB floppy disk drives, the internal floppy disk drive and its interface are unchanged, while the assembled device presents a different interface such as IEEE-488, parallel port or USB.

== Format data ==
Many mutually incompatible floppy disk formats are possible; aside from the physical format on the disk, incompatible file systems are also possible.

Drive	Format	Capacity	Transfer speed [kbit/s]	RPM	Tracks	TPI	Comment
8-inch SD	8-inch SD	80 KB	33.333	360	32	48	Only on old controllers.
5.25-inch SD	5.25-inch SD	160 KB	125		40		Only on old controllers.
5.25-inch SSDD	5.25-inch SSDD	171 KB	250–308	300	35	48	Only on C1541 compatibles.
5.25-inch SD	5.25-inch SD	180 KB	150		40		Only on old controllers.
5.25-inch DD	5.25-inch DD	320/360/400 KB	250	300	40	48	8/9/10 512 byte sectors respectively.
5.25-inch DD (96 tpi)	5.25-inch QD (2DD)	800 KB	250	300	80	96	
5.25-inch HD	5.25-inch DD	360 KB	300	360	40	48	
5.25" HD	5.25" HD	1200 KB	500	360	80	96	Up to 83 tracks. Different biasing current.
5.25" HD	5.25" HD	720 KB	300	360	80		Up to 83 tracks.
3.5" DD	3.5" DD	720 KB	250	300	80	135	Up to 83 tracks.
3.5" DD	3.5" DD	800 KB		394–590	80		Used by Apple Macintosh.
3.5" DD	3.5" DD	800 KB	250	300	80		Used by Commodore 1581.
3.5" DD	3.5" DD	880 KB	250	300	80		Up to 83 tracks. Used by Amiga computers.
3.5" DD	3.5" DD	360 KB	250	300	40		
3.5" HD	3.5" DD	720 KB	250	300	80		Up to 83 tracks.
3.5" HD	3.5" HD	1280 KB	500	360	80	135	Up to 83 tracks. "3mode"
3.5" HD	3.5" HD	1440 KB	500	300	80	135	Up to 83 tracks.
3.5" HD	3.5" HD	1760 KB	250	150	80		Used by Amiga computers.
3.5" ED	3.5" ED	2880 KB	1000	300	80	135	Up to 83 tracks.

Sides:

- SS (or 1S) – Single sided
- DS (or 2S) – Double sided

Density:

- SD (or 1D) – Single density (FM)
- DD (or 2D) – Double density (most often MFM)
- QD (or 4D) – Quad density
- HD – High density
- ED – Extra-high density
- TD – Triple density

== 3-mode floppy drive ==
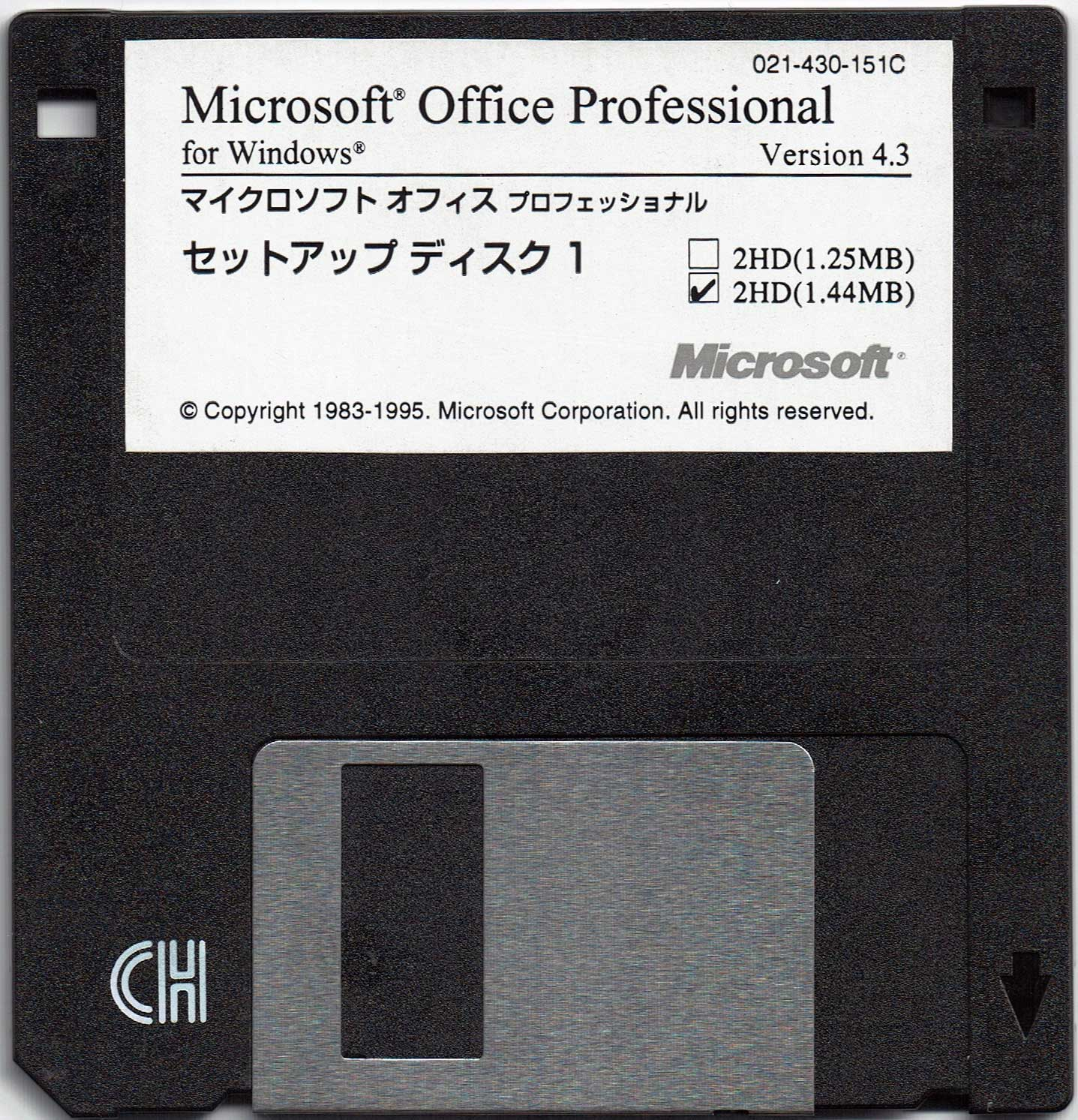
A setup disk of Japanese Microsoft Office 4.3, provided with 3.5" 1.2 MB and 1440 KB formats.

Primarily in Japan there are 3.5" high-density floppy drives that support three modes of disk formats instead of the normal two – 1440 KB (2 MB unformatted), 1.2 MB (1.6 MB unformatted) and 720 KB (1 MB unformatted). Originally, the high-density modes for 3.5" floppy drives in Japan only supported a capacity of 1.2 MB instead of the 1440 KB capacity that was used elsewhere. While the more common 1440 KB format spun at 300 rpm, the 1.2 MB formats instead spun at 360 rpm, thereby closely resembling the geometries of either the 1.2 MB format with 80 tracks, 15 sectors per track, and 512 bytes per sector previously found on 5.25" high-density floppy disks or the 1.2 MB format with 77 tracks, 8 sectors per track, and 1,024 bytes per sector previously found on 8" double-density floppy disks. Later Japanese floppy drives incorporated support for both high-density formats (as well as the double-density format), hence the name 3-mode. Some BIOSes have a configuration setting to enable this mode for floppy drives supporting it.

== See also ==
- Western Digital FD1771
- Integrated Woz Machine (IWM)
- Paula (Amiga controller)
- Floppy disk drive interface
- List of floppy disk formats
