= D765 =

D765 may refer to:

- NEC μPD765, a floppy-controller manufactured by NEC
- A CSX Transportation trash train running between Derwood and Dickerson, Maryland, USA
- A Route National in France, see Quimper
