= Western Digital FD1771 =

Floppy disk controller

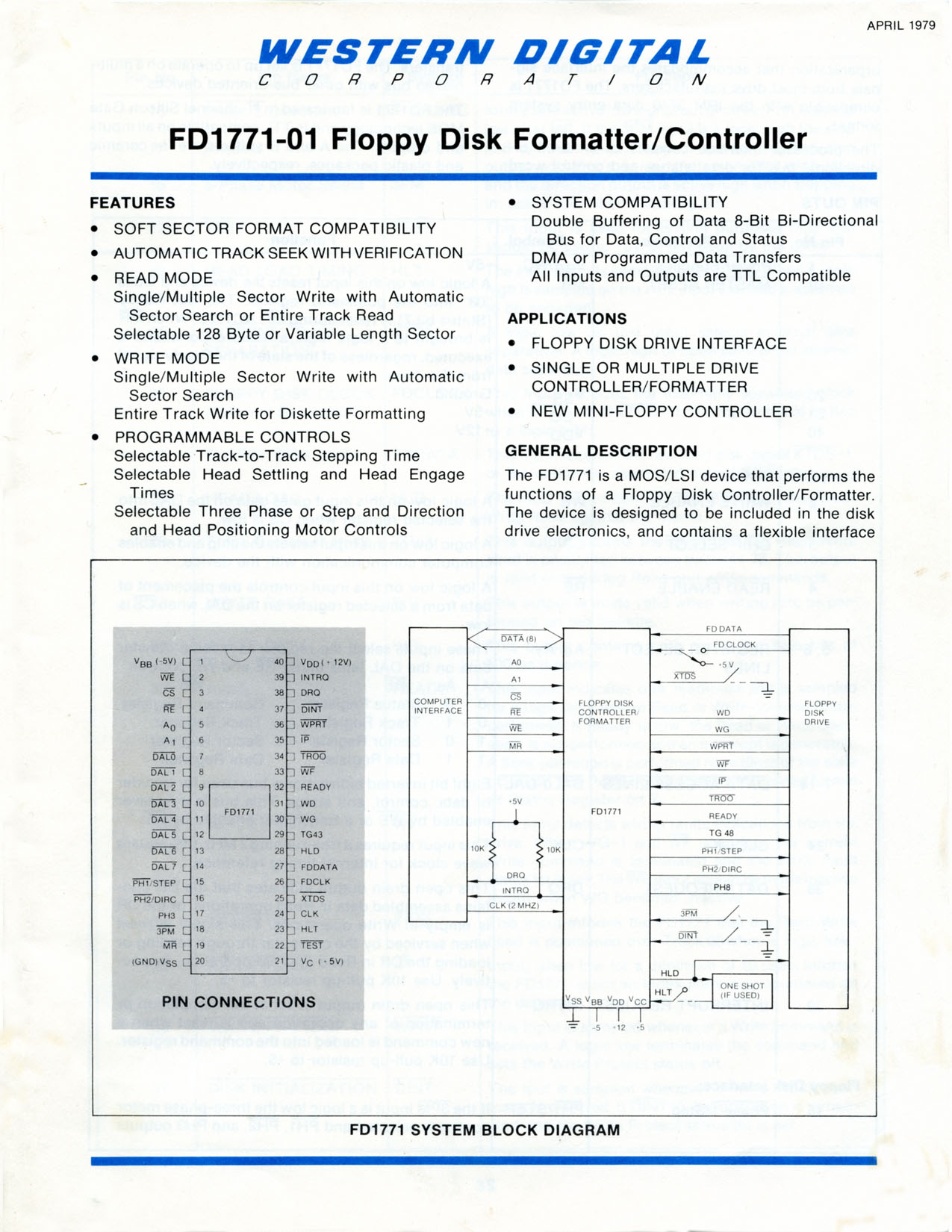
Western Digital datasheet for the FD1771 floppy disk controller

The FD1771, sometimes WD1771, is a floppy disk controller chip, the first in a line of floppy disk controllers produced by Western Digital. It uses single density FM encoding introduced in the IBM 3740. Later models in the series added support for MFM encoding and increasingly added onboard circuitry that formerly had to be implemented in external components. Originally packaged as 40-pin dual in-line package (DIP) format, later models moved to a 28-pin format that further lowered implementation costs.

== Derivatives ==
The FD1771 was succeeded by many derivatives that were mostly software-compatible:

- The FD1781 was designed for double density, but required external modulation and demodulation circuitry, so it could support MFM, M2FM, GCR or other double-density encodings.
- The FD1791-FD1797 series added internal support for double density (MFM) modulation, compatible with the IBM System/34 disk format. They required an external data separator.
- The WD1761-WD1767 series were versions of the FD179x series rated for a maximum clock frequency of 1 MHz, resulting in a data rate limit of 125 kbit/s for single density and 250 kbit/s for double density, thus preventing them from being used for 8-in (200 mm) floppy drives or the later "high-density" 5.25-inch (133 mm) or 90 mm floppy drives. These were sold at a lower price point and widely used in home computer floppy drives.
- The WD2791-WD2797 series added an internal data separator using an analog phase-locked loop, with some external passive components required for the VCO. They took a 1 MHz or 2 MHz clock and were intended for 8-inch (203 mm) and 5.25-inch (133 mm) drives.
- The WD1770, WD1772, and WD1773 added an internal digital data separator and write precompensator, eliminating the need for external passive components but raising the clock rate requirement to 8 MHz. They supported double density, despite the apparent regression of the part number, and were packaged in 28-pin DIP packages.
- The WD1772PH02-02 was a version of the chip that Atari fitted to the Atari STE which supported high density (500 kbit/s) operation. After production at WD could not be sustained, Atari decided to license the design and modify it to get high density and extra density (1 MBit/s) operation. The chip was codenamed "Ajax", had the number C302096 and was produced by Toshiba.

== Compatible chips ==
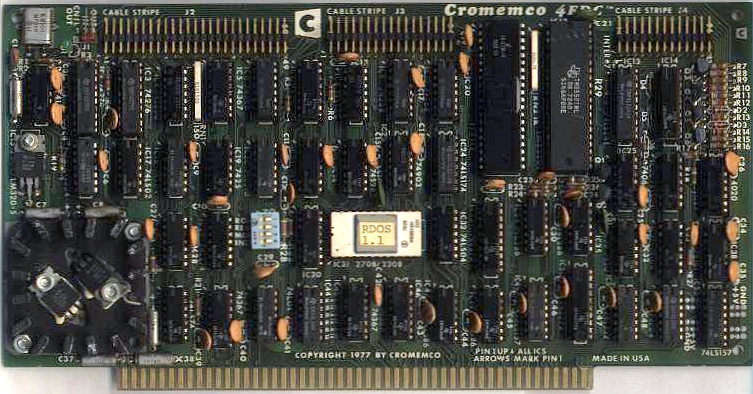
FD1771 on a Cromemco 4FDC S-100 board. FD1771 is directly below the word Cromemco at the top of the board.

Many compatible chips were available from other vendors:

- FD179x series from SMC Microelectronics
- MB8876A and MB8877A from Fujitsu
- VL177x series from VLSI Technology.
- Soviet KR1818WG93 (КР1818ВГ93) was a WD1793 analog

These were used in many microcomputers including the TRS-80, Acorn Electron, BBC Master, Atari ST, Acorn Archimedes, and the SAM Coupé, as well as the +D and DISCiPLE disk interfaces for the ZX Spectrum, the Commodore 157x/1581 for the Commodore 64 and the Atari XF551 for the Atari 8-bit computers.
