= Micropolis Corporation =

- Industry: Computer and Peripheral Equipment Manufacturing
- Founded: 1976; 49 years ago in Chatsworth, California, United States
- Fate: Restructured
- Successor: Micropolis GmbH; Singapore Technology (ST); StreamLogic Corporation
- Area served: Worldwide
- Products: Hard disk drives; External storage devices
- Website: www.micropolis.com

Micropolis Corporation (styled as MICROPΩLIS) was a disk drive company located in Chatsworth, California and founded in 1976. Micropolis initially manufactured high capacity (for the time) hard-sectored 5.25-inch floppy drives and controllers, later manufacturing hard drives using SCSI and ESDI interfaces.

== History ==
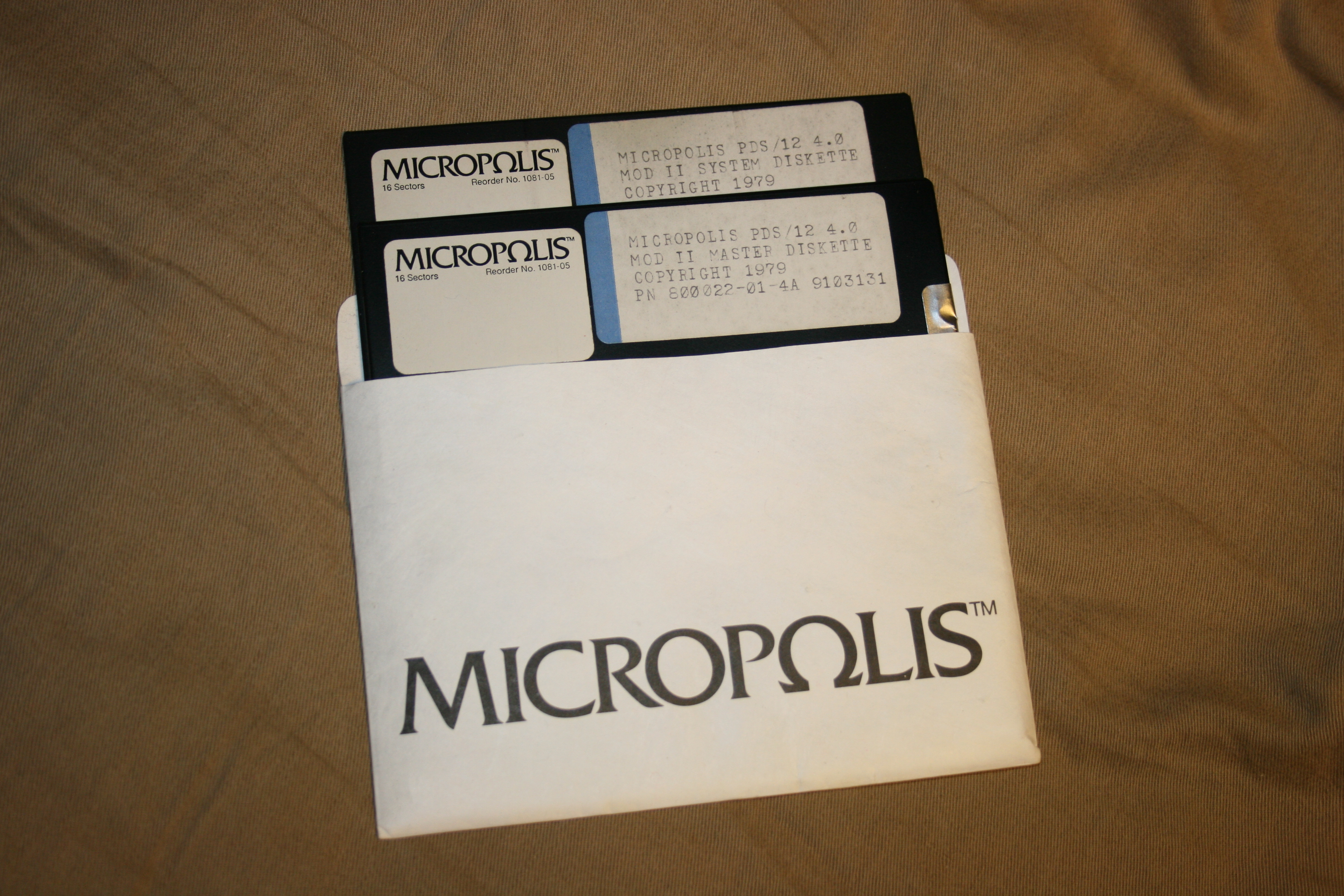
Micropolis boot diskette, as used with the Micropolis dual 5.25-inch drive to boot an IMSAI 8080.

Micropolis's first advance was to take the existing 48 tpi (tracks per inch) standard created by Shugart Associates, and double both the track density and track recording density to get four times the total storage on a 5.25-inch floppy in the "MetaFloppy" series with quad density (Drives :1054, :1053, and :1043) around 1980. Micropolis pioneered 100 tpi density because of the attraction of an exact 100 tracks to the inch. "Micropolis-compatible" 5.25-inch 77-track diskette drives were also manufactured by Tandon (TM100-3M and TM100-4M). Such drives were used in a number of computers like in a Vector Graphic S-100 bus computer, the Durango F-85 and in a few Commodore disk drives (8050, 8250, 8250LP and SFD-1001).

Micropolis later switched to 96 tpi when Shugart went to the 96 tpi standard, based on exact doubling of the 48 tpi standard. This allowed for backwards compatibility for reading by double stepping to read 48 tpi disks.

Micropolis entered the hard disk business with an 8-inch hard drive, following Seagate's lead (Seagate was the next company Alan Shugart founded after Shugart Associates was sold). They later followed with a 5.25-inch hard drive. Micropolis started to manufacture drives in Singapore in 1986. Manufacturing of 3.5-inch hard disks started in 1991.

Micropolis was one of the many hard drive manufacturers in the 1980s and 1990s that went out of business, merged, or closed their hard drive divisions as profits became harder to find. While Micropolis was able to hold on longer than many of the others, it ultimately sold its hard drive business to Singapore Technology (ST) in 1996, a subsidiary of Temasek Holdings), who ceased to market the brand in 1998.

After the disk business sale, Micropolis was reorganized as StreamLogic Corporation, which declared bankruptcy in 1997 amid securities fraud allegations. StreamLogic's RAIDION line of storage subsystems survive, now marketed by the RAIDION Systems division of Peripheral Technology Group. Its VIDEON video on demand technology was sold to Sumitomo Corporation.

Emerging from the StreamLogic reorganization was yet another company named Hammer Storage Solutions, which was formed from the purchase of the hardware division of FWB, a small Macintosh storage vendor. Its assets were sold in 2000 to Bell Microproducts.

== See also ==
- Group Coded Recording (GCR)
