= Disk density =

Storage density for magnetic disks

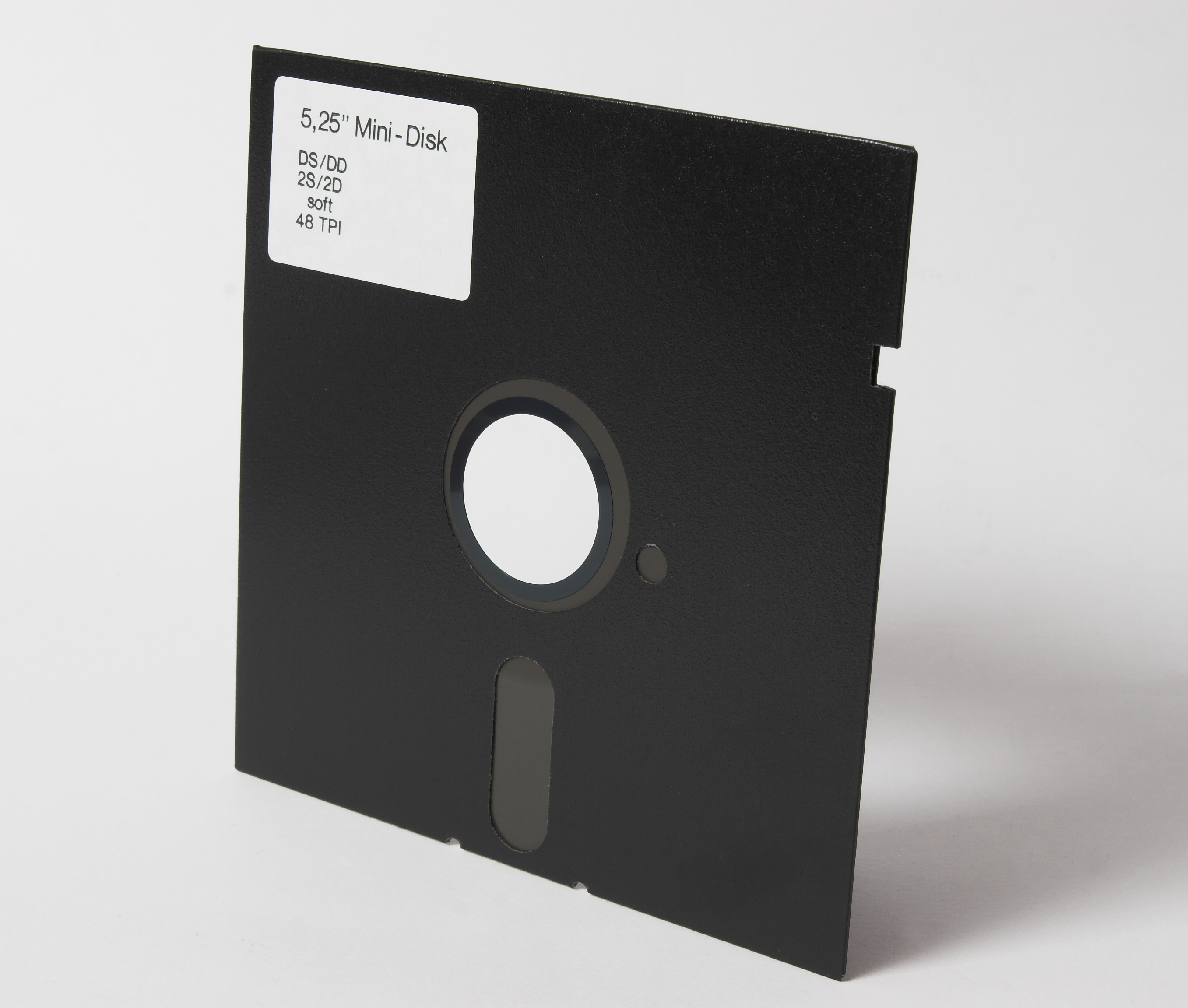
5¼-inch DD-Disk

Disk density is a capacity designation on magnetic storage, usually floppy disks. Each designation describes a set of characteristics that can affect the areal density of a disk or the efficiency of data encoding. Such characteristics include modulation method, track width, coercivity, and magnetic field direction.

== 8-inch media ==
Single density (SD or 1D) describes the first generation of floppy disks that use an iron oxide coating. Floppy drives utilize 300-oersted write heads, FM encoding, and a track width of 0.330 mm (0.0130 in) for a density of 48 tracks-per-inch (tpi) and 5,876 bits-per-inch (bpi).

Double density (DD or 2D) doubles capacity over SD by replacing FM encoding with an improved line code, such as modified frequency modulation (MFM), modified modified frequency modulation (M²FM), FM/MFM or group coded recording (GCR).

== 5¼-inch media ==
SD (1D) and DD (2D) designations were generally identical to those of 8-inch disks.

Quad density (QD or 4D) doubles capacity over DD by narrowing the width of tracks to 0.160 mm (0.0063 in) for a density of 96 tpi. Some manufacturers (Micropolis, Tandon, Micro Peripherals (MPI), Teac) used a track density of 100 tpi for quad-density drives, which were incompatible with 96 tpi models.

The Commodore 8050 and 8250 are rare instances of drives that used 375 kbit/s GCR code instead of the usual 250 kbit/s double-density format and they could store roughly 500 kilobytes on one side of a disk.

High density (HD) improves capacity by utilizing a 96 tpi track density in conjunction with improved cobalt disk coating and stronger 600-oersted write heads, allowing 9,646 bpi to be written.

== 3½-inch media ==
Double density (DD) 3½-inch disks use an iron oxide coating, just as with 5¼-inch DD/QD disks. However, drives utilize stronger 670-oersted write heads and a narrower track width of 0.115 mm (0.0045 in) for a density of 135 tpi and 8,717 bpi.

High density (HD) 3½-inch disks switch to a cobalt disk coating, just as with 5¼-inch HD disks. Drives use 700-oersted write heads for a density of 17,434 bpi.

Extra-high density (ED) doubles the capacity over HD by using a barium ferrite coating and a special write head that allows the use of perpendicular recording.

Triple density (TD) triples the capacity over ED by tripling the track density and improving other parameters. The drives used longitudinal recording.

== Overview ==
Size	8-inch		5¼-inch				3½-inch				
Density	SD	DD	SD	DD	QD	HD	DD		HD	ED	TD
Disk coating	Iron oxide					Cobalt	?	Iron oxide, Cobalt?	Cobalt	Barium ferrite	Barium ferrite
Coercivity [Oe]	290, 300					600, 660, 670	ca. 600	600?, 660, 670	700, 720	750?, 1060, 1200	?
Coating thickness [μm]	110	110	?	100, 2.5, 2.0-3.0	?	55, 1.3, 1.0-1.5	?	65, 1.9, 2.0-3.0	55, 0.9, 1.0-1.5	?	?
Line code	FM	MFM, M²FM, FM/MFM or GCR	FM	MFM or GCR		MFM	MFM	MFM or GCR	MFM		
Track width [mm]	0.330				0.160		?	0.115			?
Track density [tpi]	48				96 or 100	96	67.5	135			406.5
Bit density [bpi]	5,876, 5,922					9,646, 9,870	8,650	8,717	17,432, 17,434	34,868	36,700
Recording direction	longitudinal / horizontal									perpendicular / vertical	longitudinal / horizontal

== See also ==
- List of floppy disk formats
