= Double-sided disk =

Data storage device

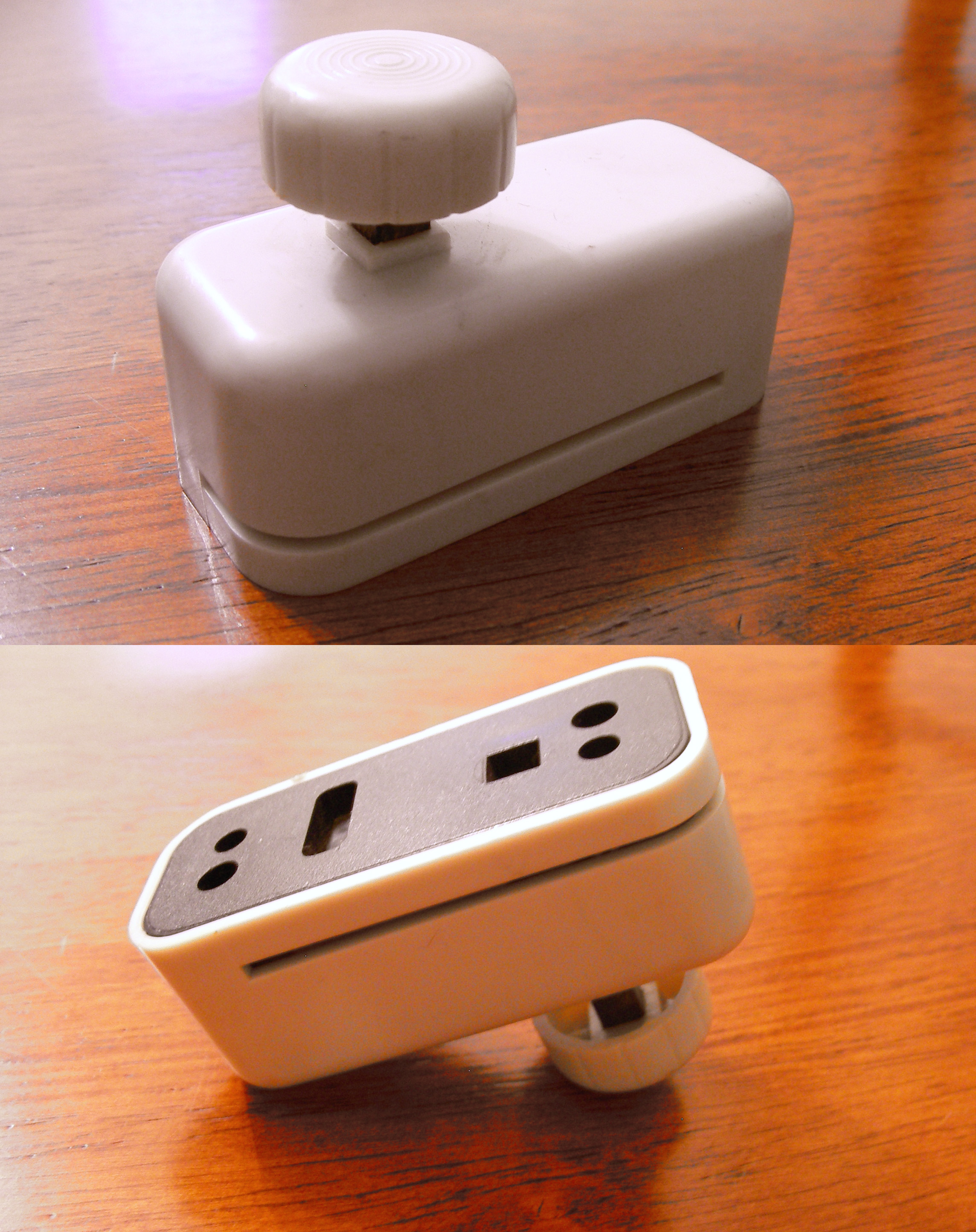
A commercially-made floppy disk "notcher"

In computer science, a double-sided disk is a disk of which both sides are used to store data.

Early floppy disks only used one surface for recording. The term single-sided disk was not common until the introduction of the double-sided disk, which offered double the capacity in the same physical size. Initially, double-sided disks had to be removed and flipped over to access data on the other side, but eventually, devices were made that could read both sides without the need to eject the disk.

Manufacturers sold both single-sided and double-sided disks with the double-sided disks being typically 50% more expensive than single-sided disks. While the magnetic-coated medium was coated on both sides, the single-sided floppies had a read-write notch on only one side, thus allowing only one side of the disk to be used. When users discovered this, they began buying the less-expensive single-sided disks and "notching" them using scissors, a hole punch, or a specially designed "notcher" to allow them to write to the reverse side of the disk.

Optical discs can also be made in single-sided and double-sided formats, often as an alternative to two-disc packages. Both sides can be either single layered or dual layered or a mixture of both. The practice mainly applies to DVDs, but some companies have experimented with pressing discs with differing formats on either side, to varying degrees of success: Universal's first HD-DVD and Blu-Ray releases were double-sided, backed with a DVD version of the movie. DualDisc and DVDplus are two variants of the double-sided DVD format where one side is a compact disc. However, these formats failed due to physical design flaws that impeded their compatibility with many commercial CD players. Specifically, the CD side was either thinner or thicker than a standard CD (whereas the DVD side was thick enough to meet standardized specifications), offsetting it from the focal length of CD players' infrared lasers, and/or causing the discs to have difficulties fitting into slot-loading players and disc changers.

It is more convenient (and cheaper) for videos or music to be released on two single-sided discs. Indeed, many titles that were initially issued as single double-sided discs were later repressed as two single-sided disc sets.

== See also ==
- Floppy disk format – explanation of single-sided double-density
