= Group coded recording =

Encoding methods for representing data on magnetic media

In computer science, group coded recording or group code recording (GCR) refers to several distinct but related encoding methods for representing data on magnetic media. The first, used in 6250 bpi magnetic tape since 1973, is an error-correcting code combined with a run-length limited (RLL) encoding scheme, belonging into the group of modulation codes. The others are similar encoding methods used in mainframe hard disks or microcomputer floppy disks until the late 1980s. GCR is a modified form of a NRZI code, but necessarily with a higher transition density.

== Magnetic tape ==
Group coded recording was first used for magnetic-tape data storage on 9-track reel-to-reel tape. The term was coined during the development of the IBM 3420 Model 4/6/8 Magnetic Tape Unit and the corresponding 3803 Model 2 Tape Control Unit, both introduced in 1973. IBM referred to the error correcting code itself as "group coded recording". However, GCR has come to refer to the recording format of 6250 bpi (250 bits/mm) tape as a whole, and later to formats which use similar RLL codes without the error correction code.

In order to reliably read and write to magnetic tape, several constraints on the signal to be written must be followed. The first is that two adjacent flux reversals must be separated by a certain distance on the media, defined by the magnetic properties of the media itself. The second is that there must be a reversal often enough to keep the reader's clock in phase with the written signal; that is, the signal must be self-clocking and most importantly to keep the playback output high enough as this is proportional to the density of flux transitions. Prior to 6250 bpi tapes, 1600 bpi tapes satisfied these constraints using a technique called phase encoding (PE), which was only 50% efficient. For 6250 bpi GCR tapes, a (0, 2) RLL code is used, or more specifically a 4/5 (0, 2) block code sometimes also referred to as GCR (4B-5B) encoding. This code requires five bits to be written for every four bits of data. The code is structured so that no more than two zero bits (which are represented by lack of a flux reversal) can occur in a row, either within a code or between codes, no matter what the data was. This RLL code is applied independently to the data going to each of the nine tracks.

Of the 32 five-bit patterns, eight begin with two consecutive zero bits, six others end with two consecutive zero bits, and one more (10001) contains three consecutive zero bits. Removing the all-ones pattern (11111) from the remainder leaves 16 suitable code words.

The 6250 bpi GCR RLL code:

4-bit value		GCR code	
hex	bin	bin	hex
0x0	0000	1.1001	0x19
0x1	0001	1.1011	0x1B
0x2	0010	1.0010	0x12
0x3	0011	1.0011	0x13
0x4	0100	1.1101	0x1D
0x5	0101	1.0101	0x15
0x6	0110	1.0110	0x16
0x7	0111	1.0111	0x17

4-bit value		GCR code	
hex	bin	bin	hex
0x8	1000	1.1010	0x1A
0x9	1001	0.1001	0x09
0xA	1010	0.1010	0x0A
0xB	1011	0.1011	0x0B
0xC	1100	1.1110	0x1E
0xD	1101	0.1101	0x0D
0xE	1110	0.1110	0x0E
0xF	1111	0.1111	0x0F

11 of the nibbles (other than xx00 and 0001) have their code formed by prepending the complement of the most significant bit; i.e. abcd is encoded as a̅abcd. The other five values are assigned codes beginning with 11. Nibbles of the form ab00 have codes 11baa̅, i.e. the bit reverse of the code for ab11. The code 0001 is assigned the remaining value 11011.

Because the all-ones code is not used in normal data, at most 8 one-bits can appear in a row. Sequences of 9 or more one-bits (in practice 14 all-ones codes, or 70 one-bits, were used) are used as a synchronization pattern.

Because of the extremely high density (for the time) of 6250 bpi tape, the RLL code is not sufficient to ensure reliable data storage. On top of the RLL code, an error-correcting code called the Optimal Rectangular Code (ORC) is applied. This code is a combination of a parity track and polynomial code similar to a CRC, but structured for error correction rather than error detection. For every seven bytes written to the tape (before RLL encoding), an eighth check byte is calculated and written to the tape. When reading, the parity is calculated on each byte and exclusive-ORed with the contents of the parity track, and the polynomial check code calculated and exclusive-ORed with the received check code, resulting in two 8-bit syndrome words. If these are both zero, the data is error free. Otherwise, error-correction logic in the tape controller corrects the data before it is forwarded to the host. The error correcting code is able to correct any number of errors in any single track, or in any two tracks if the erroneous tracks can be identified by other means.

In newer IBM half-inch 18-track tape drives recording at 24000 bpi, 4/5 (0, 2) GCR was replaced by a more efficient 8/9 (0, 3) modulation code, mapping eight bits to nine bits.

== Hard disks ==
In the mid-1970s, Sperry Univac, ISS Division was working on large hard drives for the mainframe business using group coding.

== Floppy disks ==
Like magnetic tape drives, floppy disk drives have physical limits on the spacing of flux reversals (also called transitions, represented by one-bits).

=== Micropolis ===
Offering GCR-compatible diskette drives and floppy disk controllers (like the 100163-51-8 and 100163-52-6), Micropolis endorsed data encoding with group coded recording on 5¼-inch 100 tpi 77-track diskette drives to store twelve 512-byte sectors per track since 1977 or 1978.

=== Micro Peripherals ===
Micro Peripherals, Inc. (MPI) marketed double-density 5¼-inch disk drives (like the single-sided B51 and double-sided B52 drives) and a controller solution implementing GCR since early 1978.

=== Durango ===
The Durango Systems F-85 (introduced in September 1978) used single-sided 5¼-inch 100 tpi diskette drives providing 480 KB utilizing a proprietary high-density 4/5 group coded encoding. The machine was using a Western Digital FD1781 floppy disk controller, designed by a former Sperry ISS engineer, with 77-track Micropolis drives. In later models such as the Durango 800 series this was expanded to a double-sided option for 960 KB (946 KB formatted (Note: The product flyer for the Durango 800 series documents a formatted "on-line capacity" of 1.892 MB for the diskette drives. The system, however, was equipped with two 5¼-inch Micropolis 100 tpi 77-track floppy drives by default, and 1.892 MB is about twice as large as the physical drive capacity documented in various other sources (480 KB per side), therefore, by "on-line capacity" they must have meant the available storage capacity available to users for the combination of two drives.)) per diskette.

=== Apple ===
For the Apple II floppy drive, Steve Wozniak invented a floppy controller which (along with the Disk II drive itself) imposed two constraints:

- Between any two one bits, there may be a maximum of one zero bit.
- Each 8-bit byte must start with a one bit.

The simplest scheme to ensure compliance with these limits is to record an extra "clock" transition before each data bit according to differential Manchester encoding or (digital) FM (frequency modulation). Known as 4-and-4 encoding, the resulting Apple implementation allowed only ten 256-byte sectors per track to be recorded on a single-density 5¼-inch floppy. It uses two bytes for each byte.

4-and-4 encoding table

Value		Code	
hex	bin	bin	hex
0x00	0000.0000	1010.1010 1010.1010	0xAA 0xAA
0x01	0000.0001	1010.1010 1010.1011	0xAA 0xAB
0x02	0000.0010	1010.1011 1010.1010	0xAB 0xAA
0x03	0000.0011	1010.1011 1010.1011	0xAB 0xAB
0x04	0000.0100	1010.1010 1010.1110	0xAA 0xAE
0x05	0000.0101	1010.1010 1010.1111	0xAA 0xAF
0x06	0000.0110	1010.1011 1010.1110	0xAB 0xAE
0x07	0000.0111	1010.1011 1010.1111	0xAB 0xAF
0x08	0000.1000	1010.1110 1010.1010	0xAE 0xAA
0x09	0000.1001	1010.1110 1010.1011	0xAE 0xAB
0x0A	0000.1010	1010.1111 1010.1010	0xAF 0xAA
0x0B	0000.1011	1010.1111 1010.1011	0xAF 0xAB
0x0C	0000.1100	1010.1110 1010.1110	0xAE 0xAE
0x0D	0000.1101	1010.1110 1010.1111	0xAE 0xAF
0x0E	0000.1110	1010.1111 1010.1110	0xAF 0xAE
0x0F	0000.1111	1010.1111 1010.1111	0xAF 0xAF
0x10	0001.0000	1010.1010 1011.1010	0xAA 0xBA
0x11	0001.0001	1010.1010 1011.1011	0xAA 0xBB
0x12	0001.0010	1010.1011 1011.1010	0xAB 0xBA
0x13	0001.0011	1010.1011 1011.1011	0xAB 0xBB
0x14	0001.0100	1010.1010 1011.1110	0xAA 0xBE
0x15	0001.0101	1010.1010 1011.1111	0xAA 0xBF
0x16	0001.0110	1010.1011 1011.1110	0xAB 0xBE
0x17	0001.0111	1010.1011 1011.1111	0xAB 0xBF
0x18	0001.1000	1010.1110 1011.1010	0xAE 0xBA
0x19	0001.1001	1010.1110 1011.1011	0xAE 0xBB
0x1A	0001.1010	1010.1111 1011.1010	0xAF 0xBA
0x1B	0001.1011	1010.1111 1011.1011	0xAF 0xBB
0x1C	0001.1100	1010.1110 1011.1110	0xAE 0xBE
0x1D	0001.1101	1010.1110 1011.1111	0xAE 0xBF
0x1E	0001.1110	1010.1111 1011.1110	0xAF 0xBE
0x1F	0001.1111	1010.1111 1011.1111	0xAF 0xBF
0x20	0010.0000	1011.1010 1010.1010	0xBA 0xAA
0x21	0010.0001	1011.1010 1010.1011	0xBA 0xAB
0x22	0010.0010	1011.1011 1010.1010	0xBB 0xAA
0x23	0010.0011	1011.1011 1010.1011	0xBB 0xAB
0x24	0010.0100	1011.1010 1010.1110	0xBA 0xAE
0x25	0010.0101	1011.1010 1010.1111	0xBA 0xAF
0x26	0010.0110	1011.1011 1010.1110	0xBB 0xAE
0x27	0010.0111	1011.1011 1010.1111	0xBB 0xAF
0x28	0010.1000	1011.1110 1010.1010	0xBE 0xAA
0x29	0010.1001	1011.1110 1010.1011	0xBE 0xAB
0x2A	0010.1010	1011.1111 1010.1010	0xBF 0xAA
0x2B	0010.1011	1011.1111 1010.1011	0xBF 0xAB
0x2C	0010.1100	1011.1110 1010.1110	0xBE 0xAE
0x2D	0010.1101	1011.1110 1010.1111	0xBE 0xAF
0x2E	0010.1110	1011.1111 1010.1110	0xBF 0xAE
0x2F	0010.1111	1011.1111 1010.1111	0xBF 0xAF
0x30	0011.0000	1011.1010 1011.1010	0xBA 0xBA
0x31	0011.0001	1011.1010 1011.1011	0xBA 0xBB
0x32	0011.0010	1011.1011 1011.1010	0xBB 0xBA
0x33	0011.0011	1011.1011 1011.1011	0xBB 0xBB
0x34	0011.0100	1011.1010 1011.1110	0xBA 0xBE
0x35	0011.0101	1011.1010 1011.1111	0xBA 0xBF
0x36	0011.0110	1011.1011 1011.1110	0xBB 0xBE
0x37	0011.0111	1011.1011 1011.1111	0xBB 0xBF
0x38	0011.1000	1011.1110 1011.1010	0xBE 0xBA
0x39	0011.1001	1011.1110 1011.1011	0xBE 0xBB
0x3A	0011.1010	1011.1111 1011.1010	0xBF 0xBA
0x3B	0011.1011	1011.1111 1011.1011	0xBF 0xBB
0x3C	0011.1100	1011.1110 1011.1110	0xBE 0xBE
0x3D	0011.1101	1011.1110 1011.1111	0xBE 0xBF
0x3E	0011.1110	1011.1111 1011.1110	0xBF 0xBE
0x3F	0011.1111	1011.1111 1011.1111	0xBF 0xBF

Value		Code	
hex	bin	bin	hex
0x40	0100.0000	1010.1010 1110.1010	0xAA 0xEA
0x41	0100.0001	1010.1010 1110.1011	0xAA 0xEB
0x42	0100.0010	1010.1011 1110.1010	0xAB 0xEA
0x43	0100.0011	1010.1011 1110.1011	0xAB 0xEB
0x44	0100.0100	1010.1010 1110.1110	0xAA 0xEE
0x45	0100.0101	1010.1010 1110.1111	0xAA 0xEF
0x46	0100.0110	1010.1011 1110.1110	0xAB 0xEE
0x47	0100.0111	1010.1011 1110.1111	0xAB 0xEF
0x48	0100.1000	1010.1110 1110.1010	0xAE 0xEA
0x49	0100.1001	1010.1110 1110.1011	0xAE 0xEB
0x4A	0100.1010	1010.1111 1110.1010	0xAF 0xEA
0x4B	0100.1011	1010.1111 1110.1011	0xAF 0xEB
0x4C	0100.1100	1010.1110 1110.1110	0xAE 0xEE
0x4D	0100.1101	1010.1110 1110.1111	0xAE 0xEF
0x4E	0100.1110	1010.1111 1110.1110	0xAF 0xEE
0x4F	0100.1111	1010.1111 1110.1111	0xAF 0xEF
0x50	0101.0000	1010.1010 1111.1010	0xAA 0xFA
0x51	0101.0001	1010.1010 1111.1011	0xAA 0xFB
0x52	0101.0010	1010.1011 1111.1010	0xAB 0xFA
0x53	0101.0011	1010.1011 1111.1011	0xAB 0xFB
0x54	0101.0100	1010.1010 1111.1110	0xAA 0xFE
0x55	0101.0101	1010.1010 1111.1111	0xAA 0xFF
0x56	0101.0110	1010.1011 1111.1110	0xAB 0xFE
0x57	0101.0111	1010.1011 1111.1111	0xAB 0xFF
0x58	0101.1000	1010.1110 1111.1010	0xAE 0xFA
0x59	0101.1001	1010.1110 1111.1011	0xAE 0xFB
0x5A	0101.1010	1010.1111 1111.1010	0xAF 0xFA
0x5B	0101.1011	1010.1111 1111.1011	0xAF 0xFB
0x5C	0101.1100	1010.1110 1111.1110	0xAE 0xFE
0x5D	0101.1101	1010.1110 1111.1111	0xAE 0xFF
0x5E	0101.1110	1010.1111 1111.1110	0xAF 0xFE
0x5F	0101.1111	1010.1111 1111.1111	0xAF 0xFF
0x60	0110.0000	1011.1010 1110.1010	0xBA 0xEA
0x61	0110.0001	1011.1010 1110.1011	0xBA 0xEB
0x62	0110.0010	1011.1011 1110.1010	0xBB 0xEA
0x63	0110.0011	1011.1011 1110.1011	0xBB 0xEB
0x64	0110.0100	1011.1010 1110.1110	0xBA 0xEE
0x65	0110.0101	1011.1010 1110.1111	0xBA 0xEF
0x66	0110.0110	1011.1011 1110.1110	0xBB 0xEE
0x67	0110.0111	1011.1011 1110.1111	0xBB 0xEF
0x68	0110.1000	1011.1110 1110.1010	0xBE 0xEA
0x69	0110.1001	1011.1110 1110.1011	0xBE 0xEB
0x6A	0110.1010	1011.1111 1110.1010	0xBF 0xEA
0x6B	0110.1011	1011.1111 1110.1011	0xBF 0xEB
0x6C	0110.1100	1011.1110 1110.1110	0xBE 0xEE
0x6D	0110.1101	1011.1110 1110.1111	0xBE 0xEF
0x6E	0110.1110	1011.1111 1110.1110	0xBF 0xEE
0x6F	0110.1111	1011.1111 1110.1111	0xBF 0xEF
0x70	0111.0000	1011.1010 1111.1010	0xBA 0xFA
0x71	0111.0001	1011.1010 1111.1011	0xBA 0xFB
0x72	0111.0010	1011.1011 1111.1010	0xBB 0xFA
0x73	0111.0011	1011.1011 1111.1011	0xBB 0xFB
0x74	0111.0100	1011.1010 1111.1110	0xBA 0xFE
0x75	0111.0101	1011.1010 1111.1111	0xBA 0xFF
0x76	0111.0110	1011.1011 1111.1110	0xBB 0xFE
0x77	0111.0111	1011.1011 1111.1111	0xBB 0xFF
0x78	0111.1000	1011.1110 1111.1010	0xBE 0xFA
0x79	0111.1001	1011.1110 1111.1011	0xBE 0xFB
0x7A	0111.1010	1011.1111 1111.1010	0xBF 0xFA
0x7B	0111.1011	1011.1111 1111.1011	0xBF 0xFB
0x7C	0111.1100	1011.1110 1111.1110	0xBE 0xFE
0x7D	0111.1101	1011.1110 1111.1111	0xBE 0xFF
0x7E	0111.1110	1011.1111 1111.1110	0xBF 0xFE
0x7F	0111.1111	1011.1111 1111.1111	0xBF 0xFF

Value		Code	
hex	bin	bin	hex
0x80	1000.0000	1110.1010 1010.1010	0xEA 0xAA
0x81	1000.0001	1110.1010 1010.1011	0xEA 0xAB
0x82	1000.0010	1110.1011 1010.1010	0xEB 0xAA
0x83	1000.0011	1110.1011 1010.1011	0xEB 0xAB
0x84	1000.0100	1110.1010 1010.1110	0xEA 0xAE
0x85	1000.0101	1110.1010 1010.1111	0xEA 0xAF
0x86	1000.0110	1110.1011 1010.1110	0xEB 0xAE
0x87	1000.0111	1110.1011 1010.1111	0xEB 0xAF
0x88	1000.1000	1110.1110 1010.1010	0xEE 0xAA
0x89	1000.1001	1110.1110 1010.1011	0xEE 0xAB
0x8A	1000.1010	1110.1111 1010.1010	0xEF 0xAA
0x8B	1000.1011	1110.1111 1010.1011	0xEF 0xAB
0x8C	1000.1100	1110.1110 1010.1110	0xEE 0xAE
0x8D	1000.1101	1110.1110 1010.1111	0xEE 0xAF
0x8E	1000.1110	1110.1111 1010.1110	0xEF 0xAE
0x8F	1000.1111	1110.1111 1010.1111	0xEF 0xAF
0x90	1001.0000	1110.1010 1011.1010	0xEA 0xBA
0x91	1001.0001	1110.1010 1011.1011	0xEA 0xBB
0x92	1001.0010	1110.1011 1011.1010	0xEB 0xBA
0x93	1001.0011	1110.1011 1011.1011	0xEB 0xBB
0x94	1001.0100	1110.1010 1011.1110	0xEA 0xBE
0x95	1001.0101	1110.1010 1011.1111	0xEA 0xBF
0x96	1001.0110	1110.1011 1011.1110	0xEB 0xBE
0x97	1001.0111	1110.1011 1011.1111	0xEB 0xBF
0x98	1001.1000	1110.1110 1011.1010	0xEE 0xBA
0x99	1001.1001	1110.1110 1011.1011	0xEE 0xBB
0x9A	1001.1010	1110.1111 1011.1010	0xEF 0xBA
0x9B	1001.1011	1110.1111 1011.1011	0xEF 0xBB
0x9C	1001.1100	1110.1110 1011.1110	0xEE 0xBE
0x9D	1001.1101	1110.1110 1011.1111	0xEE 0xBF
0x9E	1001.1110	1110.1111 1011.1110	0xEF 0xBE
0x9F	1001.1111	1110.1111 1011.1111	0xEF 0xBF
0xA0	1010.0000	1111.1010 1010.1010	0xFA 0xAA
0xA1	1010.0001	1111.1010 1010.1011	0xFA 0xAB
0xA2	1010.0010	1111.1011 1010.1010	0xFB 0xAA
0xA3	1010.0011	1111.1011 1010.1011	0xFB 0xAB
0xA4	1010.0100	1111.1010 1010.1110	0xFA 0xAE
0xA5	1010.0101	1111.1010 1010.1111	0xFA 0xAF
0xA6	1010.0110	1111.1011 1010.1110	0xFB 0xAE
0xA7	1010.0111	1111.1011 1010.1111	0xFB 0xAF
0xA8	1010.1000	1111.1110 1010.1010	0xFE 0xAA
0xA9	1010.1001	1111.1110 1010.1011	0xFE 0xAB
0xAA	1010.1010	1111.1111 1010.1010	0xFF 0xAA
0xAB	1010.1011	1111.1111 1010.1011	0xFF 0xAB
0xAC	1010.1100	1111.1110 1010.1110	0xFE 0xAE
0xAD	1010.1101	1111.1110 1010.1111	0xFE 0xAF
0xAE	1010.1110	1111.1111 1010.1110	0xFF 0xAE
0xAF	1010.1111	1111.1111 1010.1111	0xFF 0xAF
0xB0	1011.0000	1111.1010 1011.1010	0xFA 0xBA
0xB1	1011.0001	1111.1010 1011.1011	0xFA 0xBB
0xB2	1011.0010	1111.1011 1011.1010	0xFB 0xBA
0xB3	1011.0011	1111.1011 1011.1011	0xFB 0xBB
0xB4	1011.0100	1111.1010 1011.1110	0xFA 0xBE
0xB5	1011.0101	1111.1010 1011.1111	0xFA 0xBF
0xB6	1011.0110	1111.1011 1011.1110	0xFB 0xBE
0xB7	1011.0111	1111.1011 1011.1111	0xFB 0xBF
0xB8	1011.1000	1111.1110 1011.1010	0xFE 0xBA
0xB9	1011.1001	1111.1110 1011.1011	0xFE 0xBB
0xBA	1011.1010	1111.1111 1011.1010	0xFF 0xBA
0xBB	1011.1011	1111.1111 1011.1011	0xFF 0xBB
0xBC	1011.1100	1111.1110 1011.1110	0xFE 0xBE
0xBD	1011.1101	1111.1110 1011.1111	0xFE 0xBF
0xBE	1011.1110	1111.1111 1011.1110	0xFF 0xBE
0xBF	1011.1111	1111.1111 1011.1111	0xFF 0xBF

Value		Code	
hex	bin	bin	hex
0xC0	1100.0000	1110.1010 1110.1010	0xEA 0xEA
0xC1	1100.0001	1110.1010 1110.1011	0xEA 0xEB
0xC2	1100.0010	1110.1011 1110.1010	0xEB 0xEA
0xC3	1100.0011	1110.1011 1110.1011	0xEB 0xEB
0xC4	1100.0100	1110.1010 1110.1110	0xEA 0xEE
0xC5	1100.0101	1110.1010 1110.1111	0xEA 0xEF
0xC6	1100.0110	1110.1011 1110.1110	0xEB 0xEE
0xC7	1100.0111	1110.1011 1110.1111	0xEB 0xEF
0xC8	1100.1000	1110.1110 1110.1010	0xEE 0xEA
0xC9	1100.1001	1110.1110 1110.1011	0xEE 0xEB
0xCA	1100.1010	1110.1111 1110.1010	0xEF 0xEA
0xCB	1100.1011	1110.1111 1110.1011	0xEF 0xEB
0xCC	1100.1100	1110.1110 1110.1110	0xEE 0xEE
0xCD	1100.1101	1110.1110 1110.1111	0xEE 0xEF
0xCE	1100.1110	1110.1111 1110.1110	0xEF 0xEE
0xCF	1100.1111	1110.1111 1110.1111	0xEF 0xEF
0xD0	1101.0000	1110.1010 1111.1010	0xEA 0xFA
0xD1	1101.0001	1110.1010 1111.1011	0xEA 0xFB
0xD2	1101.0010	1110.1011 1111.1010	0xEB 0xFA
0xD3	1101.0011	1110.1011 1111.1011	0xEB 0xFB
0xD4	1101.0100	1110.1010 1111.1110	0xEA 0xFE
0xD5	1101.0101	1110.1010 1111.1111	0xEA 0xFF
0xD6	1101.0110	1110.1011 1111.1110	0xEB 0xFE
0xD7	1101.0111	1110.1011 1111.1111	0xEB 0xFF
0xD8	1101.1000	1110.1110 1111.1010	0xEE 0xFA
0xD9	1101.1001	1110.1110 1111.1011	0xEE 0xFB
0xDA	1101.1010	1110.1111 1111.1010	0xEF 0xFA
0xDB	1101.1011	1110.1111 1111.1011	0xEF 0xFB
0xDC	1101.1100	1110.1110 1111.1110	0xEE 0xFE
0xDD	1101.1101	1110.1110 1111.1111	0xEE 0xFF
0xDE	1101.1110	1110.1111 1111.1110	0xEF 0xFE
0xDF	1101.1111	1110.1111 1111.1111	0xEF 0xFF
0xE0	1110.0000	1111.1010 1110.1010	0xFA 0xEA
0xE1	1110.0001	1111.1010 1110.1011	0xFA 0xEB
0xE2	1110.0010	1111.1011 1110.1010	0xFB 0xEA
0xE3	1110.0011	1111.1011 1110.1011	0xFB 0xEB
0xE4	1110.0100	1111.1010 1110.1110	0xFA 0xEE
0xE5	1110.0101	1111.1010 1110.1111	0xFA 0xEF
0xE6	1110.0110	1111.1011 1110.1110	0xFB 0xEE
0xE7	1110.0111	1111.1011 1110.1111	0xFB 0xEF
0xE8	1110.1000	1111.1110 1110.1010	0xFE 0xEA
0xE9	1110.1001	1111.1110 1110.1011	0xFE 0xEB
0xEA	1110.1010	1111.1111 1110.1010	0xFF 0xEA
0xEB	1110.1011	1111.1111 1110.1011	0xFF 0xEB
0xEC	1110.1100	1111.1110 1110.1110	0xFE 0xEE
0xED	1110.1101	1111.1110 1110.1111	0xFE 0xEF
0xEE	1110.1110	1111.1111 1110.1110	0xFF 0xEE
0xEF	1110.1111	1111.1111 1110.1111	0xFF 0xEF
0xF0	1111.0000	1111.1010 1111.1010	0xFA 0xFA
0xF1	1111.0001	1111.1010 1111.1011	0xFA 0xFB
0xF2	1111.0010	1111.1011 1111.1010	0xFB 0xFA
0xF3	1111.0011	1111.1011 1111.1011	0xFB 0xFB
0xF4	1111.0100	1111.1010 1111.1110	0xFA 0xFE
0xF5	1111.0101	1111.1010 1111.1111	0xFA 0xFF
0xF6	1111.0110	1111.1011 1111.1110	0xFB 0xFE
0xF7	1111.0111	1111.1011 1111.1111	0xFB 0xFF
0xF8	1111.1000	1111.1110 1111.1010	0xFE 0xFA
0xF9	1111.1001	1111.1110 1111.1011	0xFE 0xFB
0xFA	1111.1010	1111.1111 1111.1010	0xFF 0xFA
0xFB	1111.1011	1111.1111 1111.1011	0xFF 0xFB
0xFC	1111.1100	1111.1110 1111.1110	0xFE 0xFE
0xFD	1111.1101	1111.1110 1111.1111	0xFE 0xFF
0xFE	1111.1110	1111.1111 1111.1110	0xFF 0xFE
0xFF	1111.1111	1111.1111 1111.1111	0xFF 0xFF

Close to a month prior to the shipment of the disk drive in spring 1978, Wozniak realized that a more complex encoding scheme would allow each eight-bit byte on disk to hold five bits of useful data rather than four bits. This is because there are 34 bytes which have the top bit set and no two zero bits in a row. This encoding scheme became known as 5-and-3 encoding, and allowed 13 sectors per track; it was used for Apple DOS 3.1, 3.2, and 3.2.1, as well as for the earliest version of Apple CP/M:

5-and-3 encoding table

5-bit value		GCR code	
hex	bin	bin	hex
0x00	0.0000	1010.1011	0xAB
0x01	0.0001	1010.1101	0xAD
0x02	0.0010	1010.1110	0xAE
0x03	0.0011	1010.1111	0xAF
0x04	0.0100	1011.0101	0xB5
0x05	0.0101	1011.0110	0xB6
0x06	0.0110	1011.0111	0xB7
0x07	0.0111	1011.1010	0xBA
0x08	0.1000	1011.1011	0xBB
0x09	0.1001	1011.1101	0xBD
0x0A	0.1010	1011.1110	0xBE
0x0B	0.1011	1011.1111	0xBF
0x0C	0.1100	1101.0110	0xD6
0x0D	0.1101	1101.0111	0xD7
0x0E	0.1110	1101.1010	0xDA
0x0F	0.1111	1101.1011	0xDB

5-bit value		GCR code	
hex	bin	bin	hex
0x10	1.0000	1101.1101	0xDD
0x11	1.0001	1101.1110	0xDE
0x12	1.0010	1101.1111	0xDF
0x13	1.0011	1110.1010	0xEA
0x14	1.0100	1110.1011	0xEB
0x15	1.0101	1110.1101	0xED
0x16	1.0110	1110.1110	0xEE
0x17	1.0111	1110.1111	0xEF
0x18	1.1000	1111.0101	0xF5
0x19	1.1001	1111.0110	0xF6
0x1A	1.1010	1111.0111	0xF7
0x1B	1.1011	1111.1010	0xFA
0x1C	1.1100	1111.1011	0xFB
0x1D	1.1101	1111.1101	0xFD
0x1E	1.1110	1111.1110	0xFE
0x1F	1.1111	1111.1111	0xFF

Reserved GCR-codes: 0xAA and 0xD5.

Wozniak called the system "my most incredible experience at Apple and the finest job I did".

Later, the design of the floppy drive controller was modified to allow a byte on disk to contain up to one pair of zero bits in a row. This allowed each eight-bit byte to hold six bits of useful data, and allowed 16 sectors per track. This scheme is known as 6-and-2 encoding, and was used on Apple Pascal, Apple DOS 3.3 and ProDOS, and later with Apple FileWare drives in the Apple Lisa and the 400K and 800K 3½-inch disks on the Macintosh and Apple II. Apple did not originally call this scheme "GCR", but the term was later applied to it to distinguish it from IBM PC floppies which used the MFM encoding scheme.

6-and-2 encoding table

6-bit value		GCR code	
hex	bin	bin	hex
0x00	00.0000	1001.0110	0x96
0x01	00.0001	1001.0111	0x97
0x02	00.0010	1001.1010	0x9A
0x03	00.0011	1001.1011	0x9B
0x04	00.0100	1001.1101	0x9D
0x05	00.0101	1001.1110	0x9E
0x06	00.0110	1001.1111	0x9F
0x07	00.0111	1010.0110	0xA6
0x08	00.1000	1010.0111	0xA7
0x09	00.1001	1010.1011	0xAB
0x0A	00.1010	1010.1100	0xAC
0x0B	00.1011	1010.1101	0xAD
0x0C	00.1100	1010.1110	0xAE
0x0D	00.1101	1010.1111	0xAF
0x0E	00.1110	1011.0010	0xB2
0x0F	00.1111	1011.0011	0xB3

6-bit value		GCR code	
hex	bin	bin	hex
0x10	01.0000	1011.0100	0xB4
0x11	01.0001	1011.0101	0xB5
0x12	01.0010	1011.0110	0xB6
0x13	01.0011	1011.0111	0xB7
0x14	01.0100	1011.1001	0xB9
0x15	01.0101	1011.1010	0xBA
0x16	01.0110	1011.1011	0xBB
0x17	01.0111	1011.1100	0xBC
0x18	01.1000	1011.1101	0xBD
0x19	01.1001	1011.1110	0xBE
0x1A	01.1010	1011.1111	0xBF
0x1B	01.1011	1100.1011	0xCB
0x1C	01.1100	1100.1101	0xCD
0x1D	01.1101	1100.1110	0xCE
0x1E	01.1110	1100.1111	0xCF
0x1F	01.1111	1101.0011	0xD3

6-bit value		GCR code	
hex	bin	bin	hex
0x20	10.0000	1101.0110	0xD6
0x21	10.0001	1101.0111	0xD7
0x22	10.0010	1101.1001	0xD9
0x23	10.0011	1101.1010	0xDA
0x24	10.0100	1101.1011	0xDB
0x25	10.0101	1101.1100	0xDC
0x26	10.0110	1101.1101	0xDD
0x27	10.0111	1101.1110	0xDE
0x28	10.1000	1101.1111	0xDF
0x29	10.1001	1110.0101	0xE5
0x2A	10.1010	1110.0110	0xE6
0x2B	10.1011	1110.0111	0xE7
0x2C	10.1100	1110.1001	0xE9
0x2D	10.1101	1110.1010	0xEA
0x2E	10.1110	1110.1011	0xEB
0x2F	10.1111	1110.1100	0xEC

6-bit value		GCR code	
hex	bin	bin	hex
0x30	11.0000	1110.1101	0xED
0x31	11.0001	1110.1110	0xEE
0x32	11.0010	1110.1111	0xEF
0x33	11.0011	1111.0010	0xF2
0x34	11.0100	1111.0011	0xF3
0x35	11.0101	1111.0100	0xF4
0x36	11.0110	1111.0101	0xF5
0x37	11.0111	1111.0110	0xF6
0x38	11.1000	1111.0111	0xF7
0x39	11.1001	1111.1001	0xF9
0x3A	11.1010	1111.1010	0xFA
0x3B	11.1011	1111.1011	0xFB
0x3C	11.1100	1111.1100	0xFC
0x3D	11.1101	1111.1101	0xFD
0x3E	11.1110	1111.1110	0xFE
0x3F	11.1111	1111.1111	0xFF

Reserved GCR-codes: 0xAA and 0xD5.

=== Commodore ===
Independently, Commodore Business Machines (CBM) created a group coded recording scheme for their Commodore 2040 floppy disk drive (launched in the spring of 1979). The relevant constraints on the 2040 drive were that no more than two zero bits could occur in a row; the drive imposed no special constraint on the first bit in a byte. This allowed the use of a scheme similar to that used in 6250 bpi tape drives. Every four bits of data are translated into five bits on disk, using the same 5-bit codes as IBM to ensure there are never more than two zero bits in a row, but in a different order:

4-bit value		GCR code	
hex	bin	bin	hex
0x0	0000	0.1010	0x0A
0x1	0001	0.1011	0x0B
0x2	0010	1.0010	0x12
0x3	0011	1.0011	0x13
0x4	0100	0.1110	0x0E
0x5	0101	0.1111	0x0F
0x6	0110	1.0110	0x16
0x7	0111	1.0111	0x17

4-bit value		GCR code	
hex	bin	bin	hex
0x8	1000	0.1001	0x09
0x9	1001	1.1001	0x19
0xA	1010	1.1010	0x1A
0xB	1011	1.1011	0x1B
0xC	1100	0.1101	0x0D
0xD	1101	1.1101	0x1D
0xE	1110	1.1110	0x1E
0xF	1111	1.0101	0x15

Like the IBM code, at most eight one bits in a row are possible, so Commodore used sequences of ten or more one bits in a row as a synchronization sequence.

This more efficient GCR scheme, combined with an approach at constant bit-density recording by gradually increasing the clock rate (zone constant angular velocity, ZCAV) and storing more physical sectors on the outer tracks than on the inner ones (zone bit recording, ZBR), enabled Commodore to fit 170 KiB on a standard single-sided single-density 5.25-inch floppy, where Apple fit 140 KiB (with 6-and-2 encoding) or 114 KiB (with 5-and-3 encoding) and an FM-encoded floppy held only 88 KiB.

=== Sirius/Victor ===
Similar, the 5.25-inch floppy drives of the Victor 9000 aka Sirius 1, designed by Chuck Peddle in 1981/1982, used a combination of GCR and zone bit recording by gradually decreasing a drive's rotational speed for the outer tracks in nine zones while increasing the number of sectors per track to achieve formatted capacities of 606 KiB (single sided) / 1188 KiB (double-sided) on 96 tpi media. The GCR code is identical to the Commodore one.

=== Brother ===
Starting around 1985, Brother introduced a family of dedicated word processor typewriters with integrated 3.5-inch 38-track (Note: The sources give slightly contradicting parameters regarding the Brother diskette formats. 12 sectors á 256 bytes would give 120 KB per side on a 40-track drive, but one source claims the drives were 38-track only.) diskette drive. Early models of the WP and LW series used a Brother-specific group-coded recording scheme with twelve 256-byte sectors to store up to 120 KB (Note: The following Brother models are known to support a 120 KB diskette format (incomplete list): WP-1 (1985/1987), WP-5 (1987/1989), WP-6 (1989), WP-55 (1987/1989), WP-500 (1987/1989). The following models are known to support a 240 KB format (incomplete list): WP-70, WP-75 (1989), WP-80 (1985/1989), WP-3400, WP-3410, WP-3550, WP-3650D, WP-760D, WP-760D+, LW-1 (1989), LW-20, LW-30, LW-100, LW-400.) on single-sided and up to 240 KB on double-sided double-density (DD) diskettes. Reportedly, prototypes were already shown at the Internationale Funkausstellung 1979 (IFA) in Berlin.

=== Sharp ===
In 1986, Sharp introduced a turnable 2.5-inch pocket disk drive solution (drives: CE-1600F, CE-140F; internally based on the FDU-250 chassis; media: CE-1650F) for their series of pocket computers with a formatted capacity of 62464 bytes per side (2× 64 kB nominal, 16 tracks, 8 sectors/track, 512 bytes per sector, 48 tpi, 250 kbit/s, 270 rpm) with GCR (4/5) recording.

== Other uses ==
GCR was also evaluated for a possible use in bar code encoding schemes (packing efficiency, timing tolerances, amount of storage bytes for timing information, and DC output level).

== See also ==
- 4B5B, another rate-4/5 code, but with looser (0,3) RLL constraints
- 8b/10b encoding, a rate-4/5 (0,4) RLL code, which is also DC balanced
- Modified Frequency Modulation (MFM)
- Run Length Limited (RLL)
- Eight-to-Fourteen Modulation (EFM)
- Error-correcting code
- Group code
- Integrated Woz Machine (IWM, a GCR disk controller in Apple computers)
- Paula (MOS Technology 8364, a GCR-capable disk controller in Commodore Amiga computers)
- Individual Computers Catweasel (a special diskette controller able to read some GCR formats)
- KryoFlux (a special diskette controller able to read some GCR formats)
