= List of floppy disk formats =

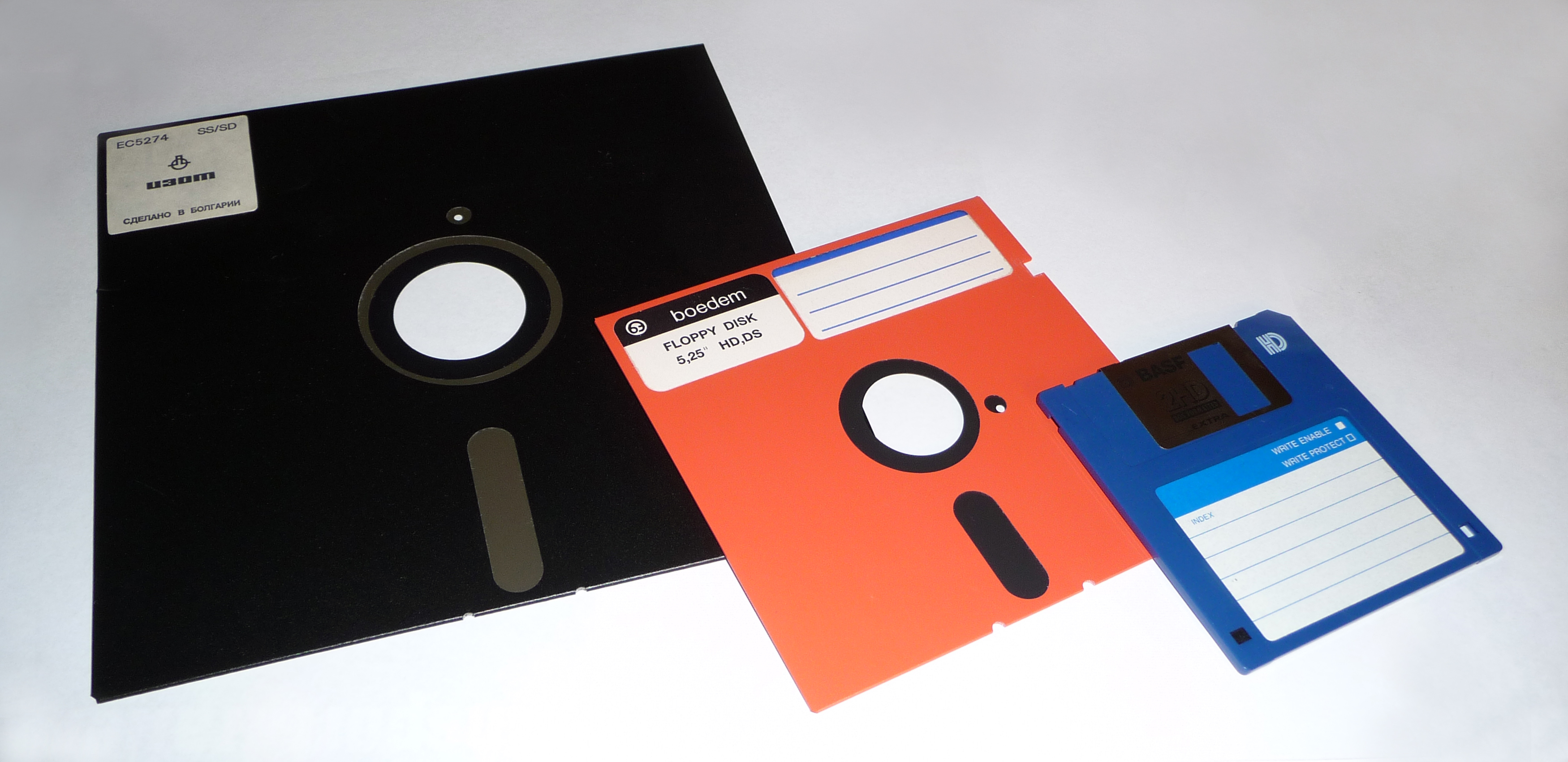
8-inch, 5 1/4-inch, and 3 1/2-inch floppy disks

This is a list of different floppy disk formats.

== Physical formats ==
Size	Density	Sides	Tracks	tpi	bpi	Sectoring	Coercivity	Unformatted capacity per side
2 inch Video Floppy			52	256				>800 kB or 50 fields of analog video
2 inch LT-1	Double		80	245				
2 1/2 inch	Single		16	48				64 kB
3 inch QuickDisk								
3.25 inch	Single	1	80	140	4,625			250 kB
3.25 inch	Double	1	80	140	9,250			500 kB
3 1/2 inch	Single	2	40	67.5	8,650	Soft	665 Oe	250 kB
3 1/2 inch	Double	2	80	135	8,717	Soft	665 Oe	500 kB
3 1/2 inch	High	2	80	135	17,434	Soft	720-750 Oe	1 MB
3 1/2 inch	Extended	2	80	135	34,868	Soft	900 Oe	2 MB
3 1/2 inch	Triple	2	240	406.5	36,700	Soft	900 Oe	6.5 MB
4 inch DemiDiskette		1						
5 1/4 inch	Single/Double	2	40	48	5,876	Soft or hard	300 Oe	250 kB
5 1/4 inch	Quad	2	77	100		Soft or hard	300 Oe	500 kB (Micropolis-compatible)
5 1/4 inch	Quad	2	80	96	5,922	Soft or hard	300 Oe	500 kB
5 1/4 inch	High	2	80	96	9,646	Soft	600 Oe	833 kB
5 1/4 inch	EH	2	104	125	29,560	Soft		6.5 MB
5 1/4 inch Apple FileWare	Double	2	80	62.5		Soft		851 kiB
8 inch	Single		77	48	3,268-3,408	Soft or hard (inner edge)	300 Oe	1 MB
8 inch	Double		77	48	6,816	Soft or hard (inner edge)	300 Oe	1 MB
8 inch	HD		154	96	20,560		600 Oe	9.6 MB
8 inch Memorex FD	650	1	50		2,400	Hard (outer edge)		1.5 Mb
8 inch Memorex FD	651	1	64		3,100	Hard (outer edge)		2.5 Mb
8 inch Burroughs	Double	2	139	150	7,100			2

== Logical formats ==
Throughout the 1970s and 1980s, many different logical disk formats were used, depending on the hardware platform.

Common floppy disk formats, logical characteristics by platform
Platform	Size	Density	Sides	Tracks/ side	Sectors/ track	Bytes/ sector	Sectoring	Capacity	rpm	Encoding	Note
Acorn	5 1/4 inch	Single	1	40	10	256	Soft	100 kB	300	FM	
Acorn	5 1/4 inch	Single	1	80	10	256	Soft	200 kB	300	FM	
Acorn	5 1/4 inch	Double	1	40	16	256	Soft	160 kB	300	MFM	
Acorn	5 1/4 inch	Double	1	80	16	256	Soft	320 kB	300	MFM	
Acorn	5 1/4 inch	Double	2	80	16	256	Soft	640 kB	300	MFM	
Acorn	3 1/2 inch	Double	2	80	16	256	Soft	640 kB	300	MFM	Format L: MOS (Electron, Master Compact)
Acorn	3 1/2 inch	Double	2	80	5	1024	Soft	800 kB	300	MFM	Format D: Arthur, RISC iX; Format E: RISC OS
Acorn	3 1/2 inch	High	2	80	10	1024	Soft	1,600 kB	300	MFM	Format F: RISC OS 3 and later. Archimedes models before the A5000 require an upgraded floppy drive.
Agat	5 1/4 inch	Double	2	80	21	256		840 kB	300	MFM	(Note: Custom controller with unique track layout.)
Amiga	5 1/4 inch	Double	2	40	11	512	Soft	440 kB (Note: This format was used by the Amiga 1020 external floppy drive and some third-party drives connected to the normal Amiga floppy drive bus.)	300	MFM	(Note: Though the Amiga used MFM, the format places sectors too close together for a standard IBM PC compatible floppy disk controller to read (appearing as one 5632-byte physical sector per track).)
Amiga	5 1/4 inch	Quad	2	80	11	512	Soft	880 kB (Note: Format used by rare third-party drives with quad density disks; such drives were usually switchable between 80-track and 40-track (A1520/PC-compatible) operation.)	300	MFM	(Note: Though the Amiga used MFM, the format places sectors too close together for a standard IBM PC compatible floppy disk controller to read (appearing as one 5632-byte physical sector per track).)
Amiga	3 1/2 inch	Double	2	80	11	512	Soft	880 kB	300	MFM	(Note: Though the Amiga used MFM, the format places sectors too close together for a standard IBM PC compatible floppy disk controller to read (appearing as one 5632-byte physical sector per track).)
Amiga	3 1/2 inch	High	2	80	19	512	Soft	1,520 kB	300	GCR	(Note: Format used by third-party gcrdisk.device driver in order to use PC-standard HD floppy drives (which rotated at a fixed 300 rpm) via the Amiga floppy drive bus. The Amiga's floppy controller could not keep up with the data rate needed for MFM recording on HD floppies without reducing rotational speed, so the third party driver used an alternate GCR mode.)
Amiga	3 1/2 inch	High	2	80	22	512	Soft	1,760 kB	150	MFM	
Amstrad CPC/PCW	3 inch	Double	1	40	9	512		180 kB	300	MFM	Single head drive, but double-sided floppy discs (total of 360 kB per floppy)
Amstrad PCW8512/9512	3 inch	Double	2	80	9	512		720 kB	300	MFM	720 kB mode uses both sides - ensure disc inserted correct way up.
Apple II	5 1/4 inch	Double	1	35	13	256	Soft	113.75 kB	300	GCR	(Note: 16 sector filesystems require a compatible disk controller (PROM update) and Apple DOS 3.3 or later.)
Apple II	5 1/4 inch	Double	1	35	16	256	Soft	140 kB	300	GCR	(Note: 16 sector filesystems require a compatible disk controller (PROM update) and Apple DOS 3.3 or later.)
Apple II	3 1/2 inch	Double	1	80	Variable (8-12)	512	Soft	400 kB	394 - 590	GCR	(Note: Apple II double-density 3 1/2-inch (90 mm) drives use variable sector numbers (tracks 00-15: 12 sectors, tracks 16-31: 11 sectors, tracks 32-47: 10 sectors, tracks 48-63: 9 sectors, tracks 64-79: 8 sectors), 394 rpm to 590 rpm.)
Apple II	3 1/2 inch	Double	2	80	Variable (8-12)	512	Soft	800 kB	394 - 590	GCR	(Note: Apple II double-density 3 1/2-inch (90 mm) drives use variable sector numbers (tracks 00-15: 12 sectors, tracks 16-31: 11 sectors, tracks 32-47: 10 sectors, tracks 48-63: 9 sectors, tracks 64-79: 8 sectors), 394 rpm to 590 rpm.)
Apple II	3 1/2 inch	High	2	80	18	512	Soft	1,440 kB	300	MFM	(Note: Apple II high-density 3 1/2-inch (90 mm) drives require a compatible disk controller and ProDOS 8.)
Apple Lisa	5 1/4 inch FileWare	Double	2	46	Variable (15-22)	512	Soft	851 kB	218 - 320	GCR	
Apple Lisa 2/Macintosh XL, Macintosh	3 1/2 inch	Double	1	80	Variable (8-12)	512	Soft	400 kB	394 - 590	GCR	
Macintosh	3 1/2 inch	Double	2	80	Variable (8-12)	512	Soft	800 kB	394 - 590	GCR	
Macintosh	3 1/2 inch	High	2	80	18	512	Soft	1,440 kB	300	MFM	
Atari 8-bit	5 1/4 inch	Single	1	40	18	128	Soft	90 kB	288	FM	(Note: Third party drives offer up to 1440 KB.)
Atari 8-bit	5 1/4 inch	Dual	1	40	26	128	Soft	130 kB	288	MFM	(Note: Third party drives offer up to 1440 KB.)
Atari 8-bit	5 1/4 inch	Double	1	40	18	256	Soft	180 kB	288	MFM	(Note: Third party drives offer up to 1440 KB.)
Atari 8-bit	5 1/4 inch	Double	2	40	18	256	Soft	360 kB	300	MFM	(Note: Third party drives offer up to 1440 KB.)
Atari ST/TT/Falcon	3 1/2 inch	Double	1	80	9	512	Soft	360 kB	300	MFM	
Atari ST/TT/Falcon	3 1/2 inch	Double	2	80	9	512	Soft	720 kB	300	MFM	
Atari ST/TT/Falcon	3 1/2 inch	High	2	80	18	512	Soft	1,440 kB	300	MFM	
Burroughs MD122	8 inch	Double	2	139	44	256	Soft	6.26 MB	524	MFM	
Coleco ADAM	5 1/4 inch	Double	1	40	8	512	soft	160 kB	300	MFM	
Commodore 64 (8-bit)	5 1/4 inch	Double	1	35	Variable (17-21) ZCAV	256	Soft	170 kB	300	GCR	(Note: Commodore floppy drives used a fixed rotation speed with variable sector density (see: Zone bit recording).)
Commodore 64 (8-bit)	5 1/4 inch	Double	2	35	Variable (17-21) ZCAV	256	Soft	340 kB	300	GCR	(Note: Commodore floppy drives used a fixed rotation speed with variable sector density (see: Zone bit recording).)
Commodore 64 (8-bit)	5 1/4 inch	Quad	1	77	Variable (23-29) ZCAV	256	Soft	521 kB	300	GCR	(Note: Commodore floppy drives used a fixed rotation speed with variable sector density (see: Zone bit recording).)
Commodore 64 (8-bit)	5 1/4 inch	Quad	2	77	Variable (23-29) ZCAV	256	Soft	1,042 kB	300	GCR	(Note: Commodore floppy drives used a fixed rotation speed with variable sector density (see: Zone bit recording).)
Commodore 64 (8-bit)	3 1/2 inch	Double	2	80	10	512	Soft	800 kB	300	MFM	
Commodore 128 (CP/M)	5 1/4	Double	2	40	26	128	Soft	260K	300	MFM	Commodore 1571
Commodore 128 (CP/M)	5 1/4	Double	2	40	16	256	Soft	320K	300	MFM	Commodore 1571
Commodore 128 (CP/M)	5 1/4	Double	2	40	9	512	Soft	360K	300	MFM	Commodore 1571
Commodore 128 (CP/M)	5 1/4	Double	2	40	5	1,024	Soft	400K	300	MFM	Commodore 1571
Commodore 900	5 1/4 inch	High	2	80	13-16	512	Soft	1,200kB	?	GCR	
DEC RX01	8 inch	Single	1	77	26	128		250 kB	360	FM	
DEC RX02	8 inch	Double	1	77	26	256		500 kB	360	FM/MFM	
DEC RX50	5 1/4 inch	Quad	1	80	10	512		400 kB	300	MFM	
HP 110	3 1/2 inch	Double	2	76	9	512		710kB	600	MFM	HP 9114A
HP 80 9800 1000 and 3000	8 inch	Double	2	77	30	256		1.18 MB	360	MFM	HP 9895A
HP 86	5 1/4 inch	Double	2	35	16	256		280 kB	300	MFM	HP 9130K
IBM 33FD	8 inch	Single	1	77	26	128		240.5 kiB	360	FM	Diskette 1
IBM 33FD	8 inch	Single	1	77	15	256		277.5 kiB	360	FM	Diskette 1
IBM 33FD	8 inch	Single	1	77	8	512		296 kiB	360	FM	Diskette 1
IBM 43FD	8 inch	Single	2	77	26	128		481 kiB	360	FM	Diskette 2
IBM 43FD	8 inch	Single	2	77	15	256		555 kiB	360	FM	Diskette 2
IBM 53FD	8 inch	Double	2	77	26	256		962 kiB	360	MFM	Diskette 2D
IBM 53FD	8 inch	Double	2	77	15	512		1.08 MiB	360	MFM	Diskette 2D
IBM 53FD	8 inch	Double	2	77	8	1,024		1.16 MiB	360	MFM	Diskette 2D
IBM PC compatibles	8 inch	Single	1	77	26	128	Soft	250.25 kB (Note: The calculated formatted capacity is based on FAT12 format.)	360	FM	(Note: While IBM didn't include an 8-inch floppy drive option on any of their PCs and PC DOS, MS-DOS 1.25 supported 8-inch disks and added support for higher capacities in version 2.0. MS-DOS' predecessor 86-DOS used 8-inch diskettes as well.)
IBM PC compatibles	8 inch	Single	2	77	26	128	Soft	500.5 kB	360	FM	(Note: While IBM didn't include an 8-inch floppy drive option on any of their PCs and PC DOS, MS-DOS 1.25 supported 8-inch disks and added support for higher capacities in version 2.0. MS-DOS' predecessor 86-DOS used 8-inch diskettes as well.)
IBM PC compatibles	8 inch	Double	1	77	8	1,024	Soft	616 kB	360	MFM	(Note: While IBM didn't include an 8-inch floppy drive option on any of their PCs and PC DOS, MS-DOS 1.25 supported 8-inch disks and added support for higher capacities in version 2.0. MS-DOS' predecessor 86-DOS used 8-inch diskettes as well.)
IBM PC compatibles	8 inch	Double	2	77	8	1,024	Soft	1,232 kB	360	MFM	(Note: While IBM didn't include an 8-inch floppy drive option on any of their PCs and PC DOS, MS-DOS 1.25 supported 8-inch disks and added support for higher capacities in version 2.0. MS-DOS' predecessor 86-DOS used 8-inch diskettes as well.)
IBM PC compatibles	5 1/4 inch	Double	1	40	8	512	Soft	160 kB	300	MFM	
IBM PC compatibles	5 1/4 inch	Double	2	40	8	512	Soft	320 kB	300	MFM	
IBM PC compatibles	5 1/4 inch	Double	1	40	9	512	Soft	180 kB	300	MFM	
IBM PC compatibles	5 1/4 inch	Double	2	40	9	512	Soft	360 kB	300	MFM	
IBM PC compatibles	5 1/4 inch	Quad (Note: Rare format appearing on some early PC/XT clones using quad-density disks.)	1	80	8	512	Soft	320 kB	300	MFM	
IBM PC compatibles	5 1/4 inch	Quad	2	80	8	512	Soft	640 kB	300	MFM	
IBM PC compatibles	5 1/4 inch	High	2	80	15	512	Soft	1,200 kB	360	MFM	
IBM PC compatibles	3 1/2 inch	Double	1	80	8	512	Soft	320 kB	300	MFM	
IBM PC compatibles	3 1/2 inch	Double	1	80	9	512	Soft	360 kB	300	MFM	
IBM PC compatibles	3 1/2 inch	Double	2	80	8	512	Soft	640 kB	300	MFM	
IBM PC compatibles	3 1/2 inch	Double	2	80	9	512	Soft	720 kB	300	MFM	
IBM PC compatibles	3 1/2 inch	High	2	80	18	512	Soft	1,440 kB	300	MFM	
IBM PC compatibles	3 1/2 inch	High	2	80	21	512	Soft	1,680 kB	300	MFM	DMF (Note: These variations are known as DMF diskettes, used for a time to pack more data on to each disk for software distribution.)
IBM PC compatibles	3 1/2 inch	High	2	82	21	512	Soft	1,720 kB	300	MFM	DMF
IBM PC compatibles	3 1/2 inch	Extended	2	80	36	512	Soft	2,880 kB	300	MFM	
Memorex 650	8 inch	Single	1	50	8	3,500 b	Hard	1.4 Mb	375	FM	
Memorex 651	8 inch	Single	1	64	32	1.056 b	Hard	2.2 Mb	375	FM	
MGT SAM Coupé	3 1/2 inch	Double	2	80	10	512		800 kB	300	MFM	
NEC PC-98	8 inch	Single	1	77	26	128		250.25 kB	360	FM	
NEC PC-98	8 inch	Double	2	77	8	1,024		1,232 kB	360	MFM	
NEC PC-98	5 1/4 inch	Double	2	80	8	512		640 kB	360	MFM	
NEC PC-98	5 1/4 inch	Double	2	80	9	512		720 kB	360	MFM	
NEC PC-98	5 1/4 inch	High	2	80	15	512		1,200 kB	360	MFM	
NEC PC-98	5 1/4 inch	High	2	77 (80) (Note: Inner 3 tracks of 8 sectors/track format are unused.)	8	1,024		1,232 (1,280) kB	360	MFM	
NEC PC-98	3 1/2 inch	Double	2	80	8	512		640 kB	360	MFM	
NEC PC-98	3 1/2 inch	Double	2	80	9	512		720 kB	360	MFM	
NEC PC-98	3 1/2 inch	High	2	80	15	512		1,200 kB	360	MFM	3-mode (Note: The PC98 3 1/2-inch (90 mm) formats are also known as "3 Mode" floppy disks, usable on IBM PC compatibles with a 3-mode floppy drive.)
NEC PC-98	3 1/2 inch	High	2	77 (80)	8	1,024		1,232 (1,280) kB	360	MFM	3-mode
NEC PC-98	3 1/2 inch	High	2	80	18	512		1.44 MB	300	MFM	
NEC PC-98	3 1/2 inch	Triple	2	240	38	512		9,120 kB	360	MFM	NEC PC-88 VA3 2TD drive only
Osborne 1	5 1/4 inch	Single	1	40	10	256	Soft	100 kB	300	FM	
Osborne 1	5 1/4 inch	Double	1	40	5	1,024	Soft	200 kB	300	MFM	
Sega SF-7000	3 inch	Single	2	40	16	256		160 kB	?	?	Expansion unit for SC-3000 home computer. Capacity is per side.
SHARP X68000	5 1/4 inch	High	2	77	8	1,024		1,232 kB	360	MFM	
SHARP X68000	3 1/2 inch	High	2	77	8	1,024		1,232 kB	360	MFM	
SHARP CE-1600F, CE-140F	2 1/2 inch	Single	drive: 1, diskette: 2 (flippable)	16	8	512		2× 64 kB	270	GCR (4/5)	Internally based on FDU-250 Micro Floppy Disk Drive Unit
Tandy TRS-80	5 1/4 inch	Single	1	35	10	256	Soft	88 kB	300	FM	Model 1/3/4
Tandy TRS-80	5 1/4 inch	Double	1	40	18	256	Soft	180 kB	300	MFM	Model 1/3/4P
Tandy TRS-80	5 1/4 inch	Double	2	40	18	256	Soft	360 kB	300	MFM	Model 4D
Tandy TRS-80	8 inch	Double	1	77	26	256	Soft	500 kB	300	MFM	Model 2
Tandy TRS-80	3 1/2 inch	Single	1	40	2	1,280	Soft	100 kB	300	FM	Tandy Portable Disk Drive (aka Brother FB-100, knitking FD-19)
Tandy TRS-80	3 1/2 inch	Single	1	80	2	1,280	Soft	200 kB	300	FM	Used only in Tandy Portable Disk Drive 2
Tandy TRS-80	5 1/4 inch	Double	1	35	18	256	Soft	157 kB	300	MFM	Color Computer
Thomson	5 1/4 inch	Single	1	40	16	128		80 kB	300	FM	Thomson UD90.070
Thomson	5 1/4 inch	Double	2	40	16	256		320 kB	300	MFM	Thomson DD90-320 (Note: The two sides are managed as two independent 160 KB disks)
Thomson	3 1/2 inch	Double	1	80	16	256		320 kB	300	MFM	Thomson TO9, Thomson DD09-350
Thomson	3 1/2 inch	Double	2	80	16	256		640 kB	300	MFM	Thomson TO8D, TO9+, Thomson DD90-352 (Note: The two sides are managed as two independent 320 KB disks)
Victor 9000 / ACT Sirius 1	5 1/4 inch	Single	1	80	11-19 (variable)	512		612 kB	252-417 (variable)	GCR	Disks varied sectors/track and disk speed to keep consistent bit density across tracks
Victor 9000 / ACT Sirius 1	5 1/4 inch	Double	2	80	11-19 (variable)	512		1,196 kB	252-417 (variable)	GCR	Disks varied sectors/track and disk speed to keep consistent bit density across tracks
Vtech Laser210/VZ200	5 1/4 inch	Single	?	40	16	?	Soft	78 kB	?	FM	RPM: 75.

Platform	Size	Density	Side	Track	Sector	Byte	Sectoring	Capacity	RPM	Encoding	Note
IBM PC Compatible	5 1/4	Quad	2	80	31	512	Soft	2.5MB	300	MFM	Rana 2000 with Rana controller card

== See also ==
- Zip drive (floppy-like, but incompatible medium using different technology)
- PocketZip (floppy-like, but incompatible medium using different technology)
- SuperDisk (floppy-like with drives also compatible with 3.5" floppy disks)
- Magneto-optical drive (floppy-like, but incompatible medium using different technology)
- List of Ecma standards (ECMA standards 54, 59, 66, 69, 70, 78, 99, 100, 125 and 147)
