= Asymmetric C-element =

Asymmetric C-elements are extended C-elements which allow inputs which only effect the operation of the element when transitioning in one of the directions. Asymmetric inputs are attached to either the minus (-) or plus (+) strips of the symbol. The common inputs which effect both the transitions are connected to the centre of the symbol. When transitioning from zero to one, the C-element will take into account the common and the asymmetric plus inputs. All these inputs must be high for the up transition to take place. Similarly when transitioning from one to zero the C-element will take into account the common and the asymmetric minus inputs. All these inputs must be low for the down transition to happen.

The figure shows the gate-level and transistor-level implementations and symbol of the asymmetric C-element. In the figure the plus inputs are marked with a 'P', the minus inputs are marked with an 'm' and the common inputs are marked with a 'C'.

In addition, it is possible to extend the asymmetric input convention to inverted C-elements, where a plus (minus) on an input port means that an input is required for the inverted output to fall (rise).
