= Supratik Chakraborty =

Indian computer scientist

- Education: Stanford University (MS, PhD), Indian Institute of Technology Kharagpur (B.Tech.)
- Scientific career
- Fields: Formal methods Automated reasoning
- Workplaces: Indian Institute of Technology Bombay; Fujitsu Research of America
- Doctoral advisor: David L. Dill
- Website: https://www.cse.iitb.ac.in/~supratik

Supratik Chakraborty is an Indian computer scientist. He is currently Bajaj Group Chair Professor in the Department of Computer Science and Engineering at Indian Institute of Technology Bombay.

== Education ==
Supratik completed his undergraduate in Computer Science and Engineering from Indian Institute of Technology Kharagpur in 1993, where he was awarded the President of India Gold Medal. Subsequently, he completed his M.S. and Ph.D. in Electrical Engineering from Stanford University in 1995 and 1998 respectively, working on the design of polynomial time approximate algorithms for timing analysis of asynchronous systems. He worked for a year in the Advanced CAD Research group at Fujitsu Laboratories of America before joining Indian Institute of Technology Bombay in 1999.

== Career ==
His areas of research include both theoretical and practical aspects of formal methods and automated reasoning. Specifically, he has worked on formal verification of software and hardware systems, constrained counting and sampling, automated synthesis, automata theory, logic, and systems biology. In the past, he has also worked on design and analysis of asynchronous systems and on cellular automata.

== Awards and honors ==
He is a Fellow of Indian National Academy of Engineering, a Fellow-elect (effective Jan 1, 2027) of Indian National Science Academy, a Distinguished Member of Association for Computing Machinery, a Fellow of Asia-Pacific Artificial Intelligence Association, a Senior Member of IEEE and a Distinguished Alumnus of Indian Institute of Technology Kharagpur. In 2021, he was elected an ACM Distinguished Member.
