= Blobotics =

Research on chemical-based computer processors using ions instead of electrons

Blobotics is a term describing research into chemical-based computer processors based on ions rather than electrons. Andrew Adamatzky, a computer scientist at the University of the West of England, Bristol used the term in an article in New Scientist March 28, 2005 .

The aim is to create 'liquid logic gates' which would be 'infinitely reconfigurable and self-healing'. The process relies on the Belousov–Zhabotinsky reaction, a repeating cycle of three separate sets of reactions. Such a processor could form the basis of a robot which, using artificial sensors, interact with its surroundings in a way which mimics living creatures.

The coining of the term was featured by ABC radio in Australia .
