= Theory of regions =

Petri net synthesis approach

The Theory of regions is an approach for synthesizing a Petri net from a transition system. As such, it aims at recovering concurrent, independent behavior from transitions between global states. Theory of regions handles elementary net systems as well as P/T nets and other kinds of nets. An important point is that the approach is aimed at the synthesis of unlabeled Petri nets only.

== Definition ==
A region of a transition system $(S, \Lambda, \rightarrow)$ is a mapping assigning to each state $s \in S$ a number $\sigma(s)$ (natural number for P/T nets, binary for ENS) and to each transition label a number $\tau(\ell)$ such that consistency conditions $\sigma(s') = \sigma(s) + \tau(\ell)$ hold whenever $(s,\ell,s') \in \rightarrow$.

=== Intuitive explanation ===
Each region represents a potential place of a Petri net.

Mukund: event/state separation property, state separation property.
