= Natural process variation =

Natural process variation, sometimes just called process variation, is the statistical description of natural fluctuations in process outputs.

== Equations ==
The following equations are used for an x-bar-control chart:

$$\bar x = \sum_{i=1}^n x_i/n$$

$$\sigma_{\bar x} = \sigma/\sqrt n$$

In the example, with n = 10 samples, the targeted mean, $\bar x$, and standard error of the mean, $\sigma_{\bar x}$ are:

$$\bar x = 1$$

$$\sigma_{\bar x} = 0.1/\sqrt 10 = 0.0316$$

That is, independent 10-sample means should themselves have a standard deviation of 0.0316. It is natural that the means vary this much, for by the central limit theorem the means should have a normal distribution, regardless of the distribution of the samples themselves.

The importance of knowing the natural process variation becomes clear when we apply statistical process control. In a stable process, the mean is on target; in the example, the target is the filling, set to 1 litre. The variation within the upper and lower control limits (UCL and LCL) is considered the natural variation of the process.

== Usage ==
When a sample average (size n = 10 in this case) is located outside the control limits, then this is an indication that the process is out of (statistical) control. To be more specific:

The Western Electric rules conclude that the process is out of control if:
1. One point plots outside the 3σ-limits (the UCL and LCL).
2. Two out of three consecutive points plot beyond a 2σ-limit.
3. Four out of five consecutive points plot at a distance of 1σ or beyond from the centerline.
4. Eight consecutive points plot on one side of the center line.

== Goal ==
The most important goal of understanding the principle of natural process variation is to consider the natural variance in the output before we make any changes to the process. Since SPC tends to minimize the process variations in time, as we better understand the process and have more experience with running it, we try to reduce the variation of it. The knowledge of the principle of natural variance helps us avoid making any unnecessary changes to the process, which might add variance to the process, instead of removing it.
