= 4B5B =

Telecommunications line code

In telecommunications, 4B5B is a form of data communications line code. 4B5B maps groups of 4 bits of data onto groups of 5 bits for transmission. These 5-bit words are predetermined in a dictionary and they are chosen to ensure that there will be sufficient transitions in the line state to produce a self-clocking signal. A collateral effect of the code is that 25% more bits are needed to send the same information.

An alternative to using 4B5B coding is to use a scrambler. Some systems use scramblers in conjunction with 4B5B coding to assure DC balance and improve electromagnetic compatibility.

Depending on the standard or specification of interest, there may be several 5-bit output codes left unused. The presence of any of the unused codes in the data stream can be used as an indication that there is a fault somewhere in the link. Therefore, the unused codes can be used to detect errors in the data stream.

== Applications ==
4B5B was popularized by Fiber Distributed Data Interface (FDDI) in the mid-1980s. It was adopted for digital audio transmission by MADI in 1989. and by Fast Ethernet in 1995.

The name 4B5B is generally taken to mean the FDDI version. Other 4-to-5-bit codes have been used for magnetic recording and are known as group coded recording (GCR), but those are (0,2) run-length limited codes, with at most two consecutive zeros. 4B5B allows up to three consecutive zeros (a (0,3) RLL code), providing a greater variety of control codes.

On optical fiber, the 4B5B output is NRZI-encoded. FDDI over copper (CDDI) uses MLT-3 encoding instead, as does 100BASE-TX Fast Ethernet.

The 4B5B encoding is also used for USB Power Delivery (USB-PD) communication, where it is sent over the USB-C CC pin (further encoded using biphase mark code) or the USB-A/B power lines (further encoded using frequency-shift keying).

== Clocking ==
4B5B codes are designed to produce at least two transitions per 5 bits of output code regardless of input data. The transitions provide necessary transitions for the receiver to perform clock recovery. For example, a run of 4 bits such as 0000_{2} using NRZI encoding contains no transitions and that may cause clocking problems for the receiver. 4B5B solves this problem by assigning the 4-bit block a 5-bit code, in this case, 11110_{2}.

There are eight 5-bit codes that have 3 consecutive 0s: 00000, 00001, 00010, 01000, 10000, 00011, 10001, 11000. This leaves 24 codes available.

== Encoding table ==
Data		4B5B code
(Hex)	(Binary)	4B5B code
0	0000	11110
1	0001	01001
2	0010	10100
3	0011	10101
4	0100	01010
5	0101	01011
6	0110	01110
7	0111	01111

Data		4B5B code
(Hex)	(Binary)	4B5B code
8	1000	10010
9	1001	10011
A	1010	10110
B	1011	10111
C	1100	11010
D	1101	11011
E	1110	11100
F	1111	11101

Symbol	4B5B code	Description	FDDI	Fast Ethernet	USB-PD
H	00100	Halt	Yes	Yes	No
I	11111	Idle	Yes	Yes	No
J	11000	Start #1	Yes	Yes	Yes
K	10001	Start #2	Yes	Yes	Yes
L	00110	Start #3	No	No	Yes
Q	00000	Quiet (loss of signal)	Yes	Yes	No
R	00111	Reset	Yes	Yes	Yes
S	11001	Set	Yes	No	Yes
T	01101	End (terminate)	Yes	Yes	Yes

Three consecutive zero bits only appear in normal data when a code ending with two 0 bits (2, E) is followed by a code beginning with a 0 bit (1, 4, 5, 6, 7), so will always appear separated by multiples of the 5-bit encoded symbol length (and never separated by a single symbol). Violations of this property are used for special synchronization codes.

== Command characters ==
The following codes are sometimes referred to as command characters. They are commonly used in pairs, although USB-PD uses 4-symbol sequences to begin its packets.

Control character	5b symbols	Purpose
JK	11000 10001	Sync, Start delimiter
I	11111	100BASE-X idle marker
T	01101	USB-PD end delimiter
TT	01101 01101	FDDI end delimiter
TS	01101 11001	Not used
IH	11111 00100	SAL
TR	01101 00111	100BASE-X end delimiter
SR	11001 00111	Not used
SS	11001 11001	Not used
H	00100	100BASE-X transmit error
JJJK	11000 11000 11000 10001	USB-PD Start Of Packet (SOP)
JJLL	11000 11000 00110 00110	USB-PD SOP′
JLJL	11000 00110 11000 00110	USB-PD SOP″
JSSL	11000 11001 11001 00110	USB-PD SOP′_Debug
JSLK	11000 11001 00110 10001	USB-PD SOP″_Debug
RRRS	00111 00111 00111 11001	USB-PD Hard Reset
RJRL	00111 11000 00111 00110	USB-PD Cable Reset

== See also ==
- GCR 4B-5B encoding
