= Differential Manchester encoding =

Self-synchronizing line code

Differential Manchester encoding (DM) is a line code in digital frequency modulation in which data and clock signals are combined to form a single two-level self-synchronizing data stream. Each data bit is encoded by the presence or absence of a signal level transition in the middle of the bit period, followed by the mandatory level transition at the beginning. The code is insensitive to an inversion of polarity. In various specific applications, this method is also called by various other names, including biphase mark code (BMC), F2F (frequency/double frequency), Aiken biphase, and conditioned diphase.

== Definition ==
Differential Manchester encoding is a differential encoding technology, using the presence or absence of transitions to indicate logical value. An improvement to Manchester coding which is a special case of binary phase-shift keying, it is not necessary to know the initial polarity of the transmitted message signal, because the information is not represented by the absolute voltage levels but by their transitions.

An example of Differential Manchester encoding: Gray vertical lines, full and dotted, represent the two clock ticks per bit period. In the shown variant of the encoding, 0 is represented by a transition and 1 is represented by no transition. The two-line signals shown differ in their polarity; which one would occur on the line depends on the preceding line state. Example given : 1337_{10} = 10100111001_{2}

There are two clock ticks per bit period (marked with full and dotted lines in the figure). At every second clock tick, marked with a dotted line, there is a potential level transition conditional on the data. At the other ticks, marked with full lines, the line state changes unconditionally to ease clock recovery.

One version of the code makes a transition for 0 and no transition for 1; the other makes a transition for 1 and no transition for 0.

Differential Manchester encoding has the following advantages:

- A transition is guaranteed at least once every bit, for robust clock recovery.
- In a noisy environment, detecting transitions is less error-prone than comparing signal levels against a threshold.
- Unlike with Manchester encoding, only the presence of a transition is important, not the polarity. Differential coding schemes will work exactly the same if the signal is inverted (e.g. wires swapped). Other line codes with this property include NRZI, bipolar encoding, coded mark inversion, and MLT-3 encoding.
- If the high and low signal levels have the same magnitude with opposite polarity, the average voltage around each unconditional transition is zero. Zero DC bias reduces the necessary transmitting power, minimizes the amount of electromagnetic noise produced by the transmission line, and eases the use of isolating transformers.

These positive features are achieved at the expense of doubling the clock frequency of the encoded data stream.

Differential Manchester encoding is specified in the IEEE 802.5 standard for Token Ring local area networks, and is used for many other applications, including magnetic and optical storage. As Biphase Mark Code (BMC), it is used in AES3, S/PDIF, SMPTE time code, USB PD, xDSL and DALI. Many magnetic stripe cards also use BMC encoding, often called F2F (frequency/double frequency) or Aiken Biphase, according to the ISO/IEC 7811 standard. Differential Manchester encoding is also the original modulation method used for single-density floppy disks, followed by double-density modified frequency modulation (MFM).

== See also ==
- Manchester code
- McASP
- Run-length limited: FM
