= Differential coding =

Technique in digital communications

In digital communications, differential coding is a technique used to provide unambiguous signal reception when using some types of modulation. It makes transmissible data dependent on both the current and previous signal (or symbol) states.

The common types of modulation that may be used with differential coding include phase-shift keying and quadrature amplitude modulation.

== Purposes of differential coding ==
When data is transmitted over balanced lines, it is easy to accidentally invert polarity in the cable between the transmitter and the receiver.

Similarly for BPSK. To demodulate BPSK, one needs to make a local oscillator synchronous with the remote one. This is accomplished by a carrier recovery circuit. However, the integer part of the recovered carrier is ambiguous. There are n valid but not equivalent phase shifts between the two oscillators. For BPSK, n = 2; the symbols appear inverted or not.

Differential encoding prevents inversion of the signal and symbols, respectively, from affecting the data.

Assuming that $x_i$ is a bit intended for transmission and $y_{i-1}$ was the symbol just transmitted, then the symbol to be transmitted for $x_i$ is

$y_i=y_{i-1} \oplus x_i,$	1

where $\oplus{}$ indicates binary or modulo-2 addition. On the decoding side, $x_i$ is recovered as

$x_i=y_i \oplus y_{i-1}.$	2

That is, $x_i$ depends only on a difference between the symbols $y_i$ and $y_{i-1}$ and not on their values (inverted or not).

There are several different line codes designed to be polarity insensitive - whether the data stream is inverted or not, the decoded data will always be correct.

The line codes with this property include differential Manchester encoding, bipolar encoding, NRZI, biphase mark code, coded mark inversion, and MLT-3 encoding.

== Conventional differential coding ==
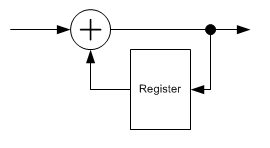
A block diagram representation of a differential encoder. Note that the output is dependent on both the current and previous register state.

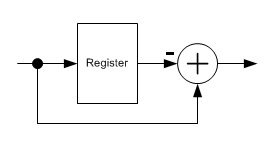
Another type of differential decoder.

A method illustrated above can deal with a data stream inversion (it is called 180° ambiguity). Sometimes it is enough (e.g. if BPSK is used or if other ambiguities are detected by other circuits, such as a Viterbi decoder or a frame synchronizer) and sometimes it isn't.

Generally speaking, a differential coding applies to symbols (these are not necessary the same symbols as used in the modulator). To resolve 180° ambiguity only, bits are used as these symbols. When dealing with 90° ambiguity, pairs of bits are used, and triplets of bits are used to resolve 45° ambiguity (e.g. in 8PSK).

A differential encoder provides the (1) operation, a differential decoder - the (2) operation.

Both differential encoder and differential decoder are discrete linear time-invariant systems. The former is recursive and IIR, the latter is non-recursive and thus FIR. They can be analyzed as digital filters.

A differential encoder is similar to an analog integrator. It has an impulse response

$$h(k)=\begin{cases}
1, & \mbox{if } k \ge 0 \\
0, & \mbox{if } k < 0
\end{cases}$$

and a transfer function

$$H(z)=\frac{1}{1-z^{-1}}.$$

A differential decoder is thus similar to an analog differentiator, its impulse response being

$$h(k)=\begin{cases}
1, & \mbox{if } k=0 \\
-1, & \mbox{if } k=1 \\
0, & \mbox {otherwise}
\end{cases}$$

and its transfer function

$$H(z)=1-z^{-1}.$$

Note that in binary (modulo-2) arithmetic, addition and subtraction (and positive and negative numbers) are equivalent.

== Generalized differential coding ==
Using the relation $y_{i-1} \oplus x_i = y_i$ is not the only way of carrying out differential encoding. More generally, it can be any function $u = F(y, x)$ provided that an equation $u_0 =F (y_0, x)$ has one and only one solution for any $y_0$ and $u_0$.

== Applications ==
Differential coding is widely used in satellite and radio relay communications together with PSK and QAM modulations.

== Drawbacks ==
Differential coding has one significant drawback: it leads to error multiplication. That is, if one symbol such as $y_i$ was received incorrectly, two incorrect symbols $x_i$ and $x_{i+1}$ would be at the differential decoder's output, see: $x_i=y_i \oplus y_{i-1}$ and $x_{i+1}=y_{i+1} \oplus y_i$. This approximately doubles the BER at signal-to-noise ratios for which errors rarely occur in consecutive symbols.

== Other techniques to resolve a phase ambiguity ==
Differential coding is not the only way to deal with a phase ambiguity. The other popular technique is to use syncwords for this purpose. That is, if a frame synchronizer detects repeated inverted sync-words, it inverts the whole stream. This method is used in DVB-S.

== See also ==
- Phase-shift keying
- Satellite modem

== External links and references ==
- Intelsat Earth Station Standard IESS-308
- DVB framing structure, channel coding and modulation for 11/12 GHz satellite services (EN 300 421)
