= E-NRZ-L =

Telecommunication binary code line

In telecommunication, an enhanced-non-return-to-zero-level (E-NRZ-L) line code is a binary code in which 1s are represented as a low level and 0s as a high level with no neutral or resting state, similar to Non-return-to-zero; However, the major enhancement over NRZ is the addition of a parity bit (usually odd parity) to the end of the bit stream.
