= Isochronous signal =

Signal occurring regularly, or at equal time intervals

In telecommunications, an isochronous signal is a signal in which the time interval separating any two significant instants is equal to the unit interval or a multiple of the unit interval. Variations in the time intervals are constrained within specified limits.

"Isochronous" is a characteristic of one signal, while "synchronous" indicates a relationship between two or more signals.

== See also ==
- Synchronization in telecommunications
- Synchronous network
- Mesochronous network
- Plesiochronous system
- Asynchronous system
