= MLT-3 encoding =

Digital telecommunication signalling method

Example of MLT-3 Encoding. Light-colored lines indicate two previous states, where: 1337_{10} = 10100111001_{2}

MLT-3 encoding (Multi-Level Transmit) is a line code (a signaling method used in a telecommunication system for transmission purposes) that uses three voltage levels. An MLT-3 interface emits less electromagnetic interference and requires less bandwidth than most other binary or ternary interfaces that operate at the same bit rate (see PCM for discussion on bandwidth / quantization tradeoffs), such as Manchester code or Alternate Mark Inversion.

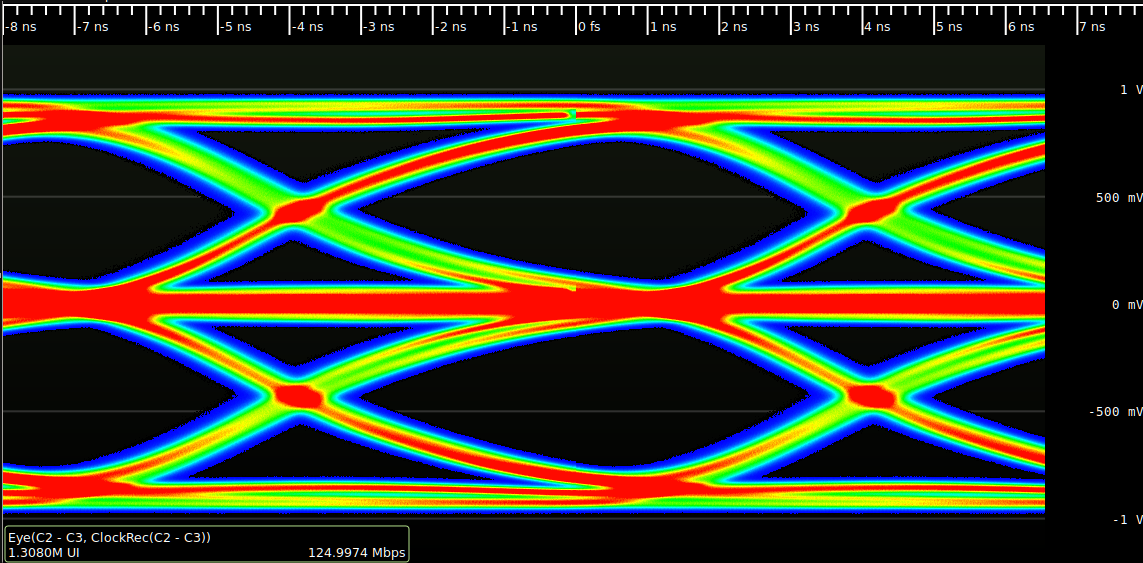
Eye pattern of a MLT-3 signal

MLT-3 cycles sequentially through the voltage levels −1, 0, +1, 0. It moves to the next state to transmit a 1 bit, and stays in the same state to transmit a 0 bit. Similar to simple NRZ encoding, MLT-3 has a coding efficiency of 1 bit/baud, however it requires four transitions (baud) to complete a full cycle (from low-to-middle, middle-to-high, high-to-middle, middle-to-low). Thus, the maximum fundamental frequency is reduced to one fourth of the baud rate. This makes signal transmission more amenable to copper wires.

The lack of transition on a 0 bit means that for practical use, the number of consecutive 0 bits in the transmitted data must be bounded; i.e. it must be pre-coded using a run-length limited code. This results in an effective bitrate slightly lower than one bit per baud or four bits per cycle.

MLT-3 was first introduced by Crescendo Communications as a coding scheme for FDDI copper interconnect (TP-PMD, a.k.a. CDDI). Later, the same technology was used in the 100BASE-TX physical medium dependent sublayer, given the considerable similarities between FDDI and 100BASE-[TF]X physical media attachment layer (section 25.3 of IEEE802.3-2002 specifies that ANSI X3.263:1995 TP-PMD should be consulted, with minor exceptions).

Signaling specified by 100BASE-T4 Ethernet, while it has three levels, is not compatible with MLT-3. It uses selective base-2 to base-3 conversion with direct mapping of base-3 digits to line levels (8B6T code).

== See also ==
- 4B5B
