= Mesochronous network =

A mesochronous network is a telecommunications network whose clocks run at the same frequency but with a constant phase shift. Compare synchronous network.

== See also ==
- Synchronization in telecommunications
- Isochronous signal
- Plesiochronous system
- Asynchronous system
