= G.811 =

G.811 Timing characteristics of primary reference clocks is a recommendation from the ITU Telecommunication Standardization Sector (ITU-T). It specifies requirements for primary reference clock devices in synchronization networks. It discusses timing requirements for connecting national telecommunications networks. Primary reference clocks need to be highly accurate and are often based on caesium atomic clocks that meet the standards of G.811.
