= Alternate-Phase Return-to-Zero =

Optical line code

Alternate-Phase Return-to-Zero (APRZ) is an optical line code.

In APRZ the field intensity drops to zero between consecutive bits, and the field phase alternates between neighbouring bits, so that if the phase of the signal is, for example, 0 in even bits (bit number 2n), the phase in odd bit slots (bit number 2n+1) will be ΔΦ, the phase alternation amplitude.

== Special cases ==
Return-to-zero can be seen as a special case of APRZ in which ΔΦ=0, while Carrier-Suppressed Return-to-Zero (CSRZ) can be viewed as a special case of APRZ in which ΔΦ=π (and the duty cycle is 67%, at least in the standard form of CSRZ).

APRZ can be used to generate specific optical modulation formats, for example, APRZ-OOK, in which data is coded on the intensity of the signal using a binary scheme (light on=1, light off=0). APRZ is often used to designate APRZ-OOK.

== Characteristics ==
The characteristic properties of an APRZ signal are those to have a spectrum similar to that of an RZ signal, except that frequency peaks at a spacing of B_{R}/2 as opposed to B_{R} are observed (where B_{R} is the bit rate).
