= Carrier-Suppressed Return-to-Zero =

Optical line code

Carrier-Suppressed Return-to-Zero (CSRZ) is an optical line code.

== Overview ==
In CSRZ the field intensity drops to zero between consecutive bits (RZ), and the field phase alternates by π radians between neighbouring bits, so that if the phase of the signal is e.g. 0 in even bits (bit number 2n), the phase in odd bit slots (bit number 2n+1) will be π, the phase alternation amplitude. In its standard form CSRZ is generated by a single Mach–Zehnder modulator (MZM), driven by two sinusoidal waves at half the bit rate B_{R}, and in phase opposition. This gives rise to characteristically broad pulses (duty cycle 67%).

The signal format Alternate-Phase Return-to-Zero (APRZ) can be viewed as a generalisation of CSRZ in which the phase alternation can take up any value ΔΦ (and not necessarily only π) and the duty cycle is also a free parameter.

CSRZ can be used to generate specific optical modulation formats, e.g. CSRZ-OOK, in which data is coded on the intensity of the signal using a binary scheme (light on=1, light off=0), or CSRZ-DPSK, in which data is coded on the differential phase of the signal, etc. CSRZ is often used to designate APRZ-OOK.

The characteristic properties of an CSRZ signal are those to have a spectrum similar to that of an RZ signal, except that frequency peaks (still at a spacing of B_{R}) are shifted by B_{R}/2 with respect to RZ, so that no peak is present at the carrier and power is ideally zero at the carrier frequency (hence the name).

Compared to standard RZ-OOK, the CSRZ-OOK is considered to be more tolerant to filtering and chromatic dispersion, thanks to its narrower spectrum.
