= Bit slip =

Loss or gain of bits in digital transmission

In digital transmission, bit slip is the loss or gain of a bit or bits, caused by clock drift – variations in the respective clock rates of the transmitting and receiving devices.

One cause of bit slip is overflow of a receive buffer that occurs when the transmitter's clock rate exceeds that of the receiver. This causes one or more bits to be dropped for lack of storage capacity.

One way to maintain timing between transmitting and receiving devices is to employ an asynchronous protocol such as start-stop. Alternatively, bit slip can be prevented by using a self-clocking signal (such as a signal modulated using OQPSK) or using a line coding such as Manchester encoding.

Another cause is "losing count", as on a hard drive: if a hard drive encounters a long string of 0s, without any 1s (or a string of 1s without 0s), it may lose track of the frame between fields, and suffer bit slip. When a pulse of N consecutive zero bits are sent, clock drift may cause the hardware to apparently detect N-1 zero bits or N+1 zero bits – both kinds of errors are called bit slip. Thus one prevents long strings without change via such devices as run length limited codes.

Many communication systems use linear-feedback shift register scrambling to prevent long strings of 0s (or other symbol), including VSAT, 1000BASE-T, RFC 2615, etc. While a scrambler makes the "losing count" type of bit slip error occur far less often, when bit slip errors do occur (perhaps for other reasons), scramblers have the property of expanding small errors that add or lose a single bit into a much longer burst of errors.

The optimized cipher feedback mode (OCFB), the statistical self-synchronization mode, and the "one-bit CFB mode" also expand small bit-slip errors into a longer burst of errors, but eventually recover and produce the correct decrypted plaintext. A bit-slip error when using any other block cipher mode of operation generally results in complete corruption of the rest of the message.

== See also ==
- Clock drift
- Deletion channel
- Erasure code
- Self-synchronizing code
