= Anisochronous =

In telecommunications, the term anisochronous refers to a periodic signal, pertaining to transmission in which the time interval separating any two corresponding transitions is not necessarily related to the time interval separating any other two transitions. It can also pertain to a data transmission in which there is always a whole number of unit intervals between any two significant instants in the same block or character, but not between significant instants in different blocks or characters.

In practice, anisochronous typically means that data packets are not arriving in the same order they were transmitted, thus dramatically altering the quality of a multimedia transmission (e.g. voice, video, music), or after processing to restore isochronicity, have had significant amounts of latency added. Isochronous and anisochronous are characteristics, while synchronous and asynchronous are relationships.
