= Network isolator =

Device protecting from electrical spikes

Network isolators are installed as part of a wired Ethernet system as galvanic isolators to reduce the potential for electrical injury and limit the extent of damage due to lightning strikes.

Through the applied principle of electromagnetic induction, network data is transmitted across an electrically non-conducting barrier. High frequency AC voltages conveying data are induced across an isolating gap.

The network isolator is a passive device, and functions without any requirement of an external power supply. A functional equivalent to network isolators is Ethernet over a small stretch of optical fibre, using media converters or Ethernet switches/network cards with fiber connections on each end.

== Applications ==
Network isolators have many other applications in overcoming the problems of differing ground potentials across networks, or between network components. For example:

- Electrical testing facilities, where measurement and monitoring equipment are connected to a central control centre through an Ethernet;
- For redundant server systems, which are physically connected via a copper network;
- For private or commercial networks, where inherent potential differences within a building, or between buildings, become problematic, and a fibre-optic solution is not economically viable;
- General usage as filters for shield currents in Ethernet connections.

=== Medical ===
Network isolators are used in medical devices to protect patients against leakage currents.

Network connections between medical devices and Ethernet networks (and other non-medical devices, such as personal computers) must be in accordance with the IEC 60601-1 standard. This standard specifically deals with medical electronic and electrical equipment and systems, and classifies non-medical devices as potential hazard sources. A specific hazard stems from possible differences in ground potentials between network components, which, when not properly isolated, can result in a leakage current that can flow through the patient, which is dangerous, and potentially lethal. Such voltage differences can also arise through incorrect installation and wiring of network systems, electrical shorting within damaged cables and cabling, or shorting between damaged network cables and other voltage sources.

Network isolators work to remove this hazard, by electrically disconnecting medical devices from a network. Isolators may be used as network accessories, built into medical devices, or installed within a medical network system. Networks isolators should be installed as close as possible to the medical device in question. As they serve no therapeutic or diagnostic purpose, network isolators themselves are not classed as medical electronic equipment according to the IEC 60601-1 standard, nor do they fall within the scope of the Medical Devices Directive 93/42/EEC. They are often installed in the medical field in conjunction with isolation transformers, which serve to protect the patient from other electrical faults.

== Technical requirements ==
The international standard IEC 60601-1 Medical Electrical Equipment (3rd edition) specifies stringent criteria on the safety and isolation of medical devices. These requirements are of course much more stringent than those of a typical consumer product standard (i.e. IEC 60950 Safety of Information Technology Equipment), as the patient may be unconscious, anaesthetised, or otherwise unable to move, and the need for patient protection is therefore paramount.

The IEC 60601-1 standard requires that two independent precautionary measures (Means of Patient Protection, or MOPPs) are set in place, to protect the patient from electrical shock in the medical system. A network isolator can be constructed to provide one or both required MOPPs. In the case where only a single MOPP is present in a system, a second measure of protection for the medical device must be made. This can be achieved, for example, by installing a fixed, low-resistance earthing cable, bar, or strap, referred to as a potential equalisation conductor. Conformation to the requirements of applicable standards and guidelines, in particular the IEC 60601-1 standard, involves manufacturers themselves declaring CE compliance and/or gaining certification from an approved independent testing laboratory.

The number of MOPPs a network isolator provides will be stated in the certification of the device. These are achieved by a combination of clearance and creepage distances, and the breakdown voltage of the insulating materials. Although requirements on breakdown voltage levels are 1.5 kilovolts for one MOPP, and 4 kilovolts for two MOPPs, the number of MOPPs actually provided cannot be derived from the breakdown voltage alone.

Network connections made with unshielded cables are occasionally used as a form of isolation, in that no shield connection exists between the device and the network. However, this fails to provide sufficient protection in the scope of IEC 60601-1, as the data lines themselves are not isolated, and may be floating at dangerous voltage potentials.

Network cards and other active network components which are designed to meet IEC 60950 (Safety of Information Technology Equipment), will usually not comply with the more demanding isolation requirements of IEC 60601-1 (Medical Electrical Equipment), and therefore require additional isolation before being used in medical applications.

The transmission quality of a network isolator can be determined by measuring the industry standard parameters or characteristics, for example, insertion loss, return loss, and near-end crosstalk.

By definition, a network isolator eliminates direct electrical connections between devices connected through a network - specifically, all the data lines, and the cable shield.

== Models ==
Network isolators are commercially available in various designs, to suit customers’ requirements:

- Standalone devices, ready for immediate and simple installation
- Isolating components, suitable for OEM manufacturers
- Integrated into network wall sockets, for permanent installations

Voltage ratings (rated in kilovolts) and maximum transmission speeds (e.g. 1000BASE-T) vary between models.

== See also ==
- Ethernet over twisted pair
- Ethernet physical layer
