= Run-length limited =

Coding technique in communication technology

Run-length limited (RLL) is a line coding technique that is used to send arbitrary data over a communications channel with bandwidth limits. RLL is used in both telecommunication and storage systems that move a medium past a fixed recording head.

Different run-length limited codes are often distinguished with the parametrized nomenclature (d,k) RLL, but they are actually defined by four main parameters: m, n, d, k. The first two, m/n, refer to the rate of the code, while the remaining two specify the minimal d and maximal k number of zeroes between consecutive ones. Specifically, RLL bounds the length of stretches (runs) of repeated bits during which the signal does not change. If the runs are too long, clock recovery is difficult; if they are too short, the high frequencies might be attenuated by the communications channel. By modulating the data, RLL reduces the timing uncertainty in decoding the stored data, which would lead to the possible erroneous insertion or removal of bits when reading the data back. This mechanism ensures that the boundaries between bits can always be accurately found (preventing bit slip), while efficiently using the media to reliably store the maximal amount of data in a given space.

Degenerate RLL encoding schemes, such as FM and MFM code, which were widely used in hard disk drives until the mid-1980s. Higher-density (2,7) RLL and (1,7) RLL codes became the de facto industry standard for hard disks by the early 1990s. Higher order RLL codes are still used in digital optical discs such as CD, DVD, MD, Hi-MD and Blu-ray.

== Need for RLL coding ==
On a hard disk drive, information is represented by changes in the direction of the magnetic field on the disk, and on magnetic media, the playback output is proportional to the density of flux transition. In a computer, information is represented by the voltage on a wire. No voltage on the wire in relation to a defined ground level would be a binary zero, and a positive voltage on the wire in relation to ground represents a binary one. Magnetic media, on the other hand, always carries a magnetic flux – either a "north" pole or a "south" pole. In order to convert the magnetic fields to binary data, some encoding method must be used to translate between the two.

One of the simplest practical codes, modified non-return-to-zero-inverted (NRZI), simply encodes a 1 as a magnetic polarity transition, also known as a "flux reversal", and a zero as no transition. With the disk spinning at a constant rate, each bit is given an equal time period, a "data window", for the magnetic signal that represents that bit, and the flux reversal, if any, occurs at the start of this window. (Note: older hard disks used one fixed length of time as the data window over the whole disk, but modern disks are more complicated; for more on this, see zoned bit recording.)

This method is not quite that simple, as the playback output is proportional to the density of ones, a long run of zeros means no playback output at all.

In a simple example, consider the binary pattern 101 with a data window of 1 ns (one nanosecond, or one billionth of a second). This will be stored on the disk as a change, followed by no change, and then another change. If the preceding magnetic polarity was already positive, the resulting pattern might look like this: −−+. A value of 255, or all binary ones, would be written as −+−+−+−+ or +−+−+−+−. A zero byte would be written as ++++++++ or −−−−−−−−. A 512-byte sector of zeros would be written as 4096 sequential bits with the same polarity.

Since a disk drive is a physical piece of hardware, the rotational speed of the drive can change slightly, due to a change in the motor speed or thermal expansion of the disk platter. The physical media on a floppy disk can also become deformed, causing larger timing errors, and the timing circuit on the controller itself may have small variations in speed. The problem is that, with a long string of zeros, there's no way for the disk drive's controller to know the exact position of the read head, and thus no way to know exactly how many zeros there are. A speed variation of even 0.1%, which is more precise than any practical floppy drive, could result in 4 bits being added to or removed from the 4096-bit data stream. Without some form of synchronization and error correction, the data would become completely unusable.

The other problem is due to the limits of magnetic media itself: it is only possible to write so many polarity changes in a certain amount of space, so there's an upper limit to how many ones can also be written sequentially, this depends on the linear velocity and the head gap.

To prevent this problem, data is coded in such a way that long repetitions of a single binary value do not occur. By limiting the number of zeros written consecutively to some maximum k, this makes it possible for the drive controller to stay synchronized. By limiting the number of zeros written in a row to some minimum d between each and every one, the overall frequency of polarity changes is reduced, allowing the drive to store more data in the same amount of space, resulting in either a smaller package for the same amount of data or more storage in the same size package.

== History ==
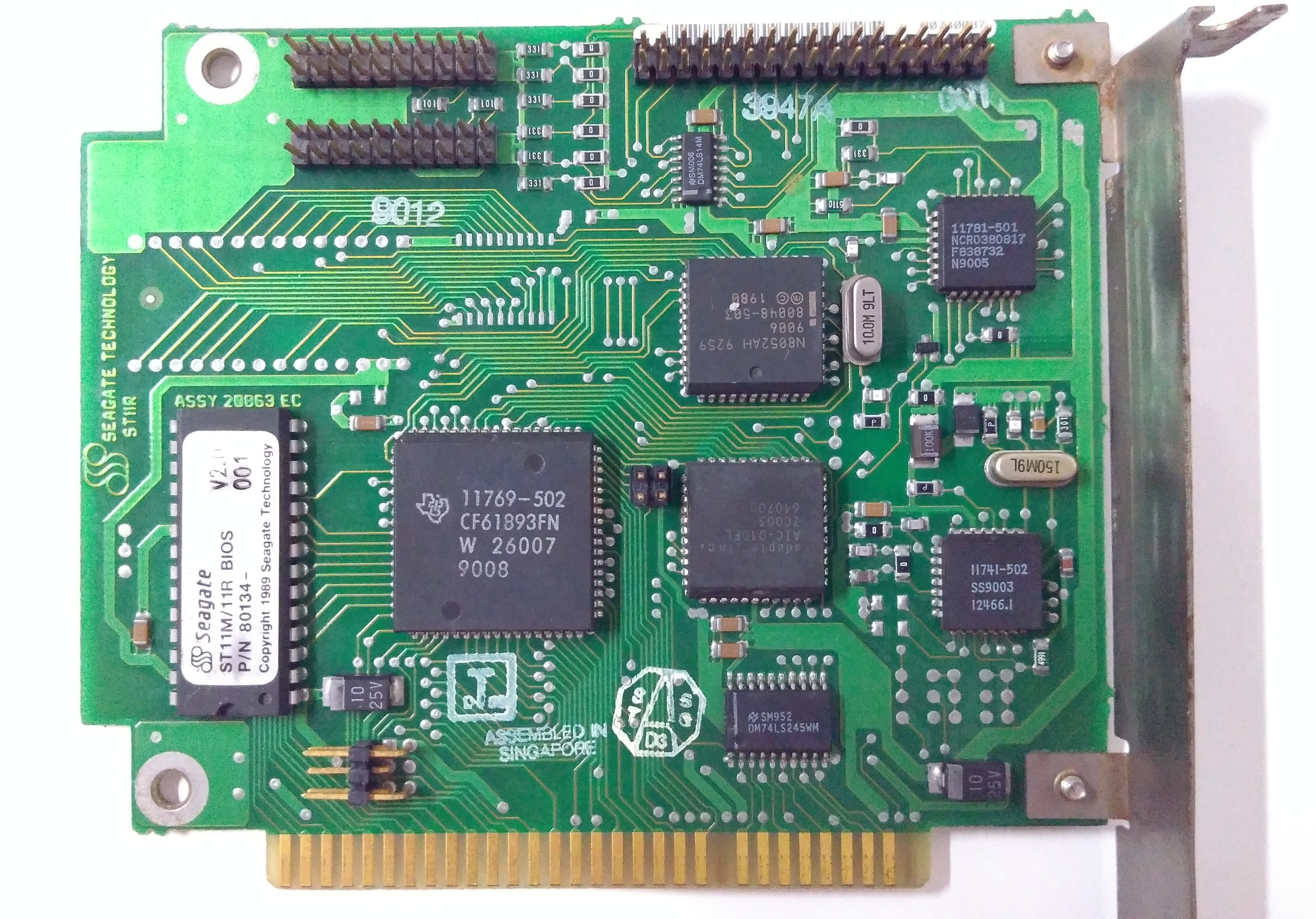
Seagate ST11R, an 8-bit ISA RLL hard disk controller produced in 1990.

The name "RLL" is commonly used only for the more complex variants but the early methods of recording to magnetic disks, frequency modulation (FM) and modified frequency modulation (MFM), are actually degenerate RLL variants as they limited the length of transition-free runs.

Outside of these simple versions, the first RLL code used in hard drives was (2,7) RLL, developed by IBM engineers and first used commercially in 1979 on the IBM 3370 DASD, for use with the 4300 series mainframe. During the late 1980s, PC hard disks began using RLL proper (i.e. variants more complex than those that had received their own proper names, such as MFM). RLL codes have found almost universal application in optical-disc recording practice since 1980. In consumer electronics, RLLs like the EFM code (rate = 8/17, d = 2, k = 10) are employed in the Compact Disc (CD) and MiniDisc (MD), and the EFMPlus code (rate = 8/16, d = 2, k = 10) used in the DVD. Parameters d and k are the minimal and maximal allowed run lengths. For more coverage on the storage technologies, the references cited in this article are useful.

== Technical overview ==
Generally run length is the number of bits for which signal remains unchanged. A run length of 3 for bit 1, represents a sequence 111. For instance, the pattern of magnetic polarizations on the disk might be +−−−−++−−−++++++, with runs of length 1, 4, 2, 3, and 6. However, run-length limited coding terminology assumes NRZI encoding, so 1 bits indicate changes and 0 bits indicate the absence of change, the above sequence would be expressed as 11000101001000001, and only runs of zero bits are counted.

Somewhat confusingly, the run length is the number of zeros (0, 3, 1, 2 and 5 in the preceding) between adjacent ones, which is one less than the number of bit times the signal actually remains unchanged. Run-length limited sequences are characterized by two parameters, d and k, which stipulate the minimal and maximal zero-bit run length that can occur in the sequence. So RLL codes are generally specified as (d,k) RLL, e.g.: (1,3) RLL.

== Coding ==
In the encoded format a "1" bit indicates a flux transition, while a "0" indicates that the magnetic field on the disk does not change for that time interval.

=== FM: (0,1) RLL ===
Generally, the term "RLL code" is used to refer to more elaborate encodings, but the original Frequency Modulation code, also called differential Manchester encoding, can be seen as a degenerate rate-1/2 RLL code. The added 1 bits are referred to as clock bits.

Data	Encoded
0	10
1	11

Example:

Data:    0 0 1 0 1 1 0 1 0 0 0 1 1 0
Encoded: 1010111011111011101010111110
Clock:   1 1 1 1 1 1 1 1 1 1 1 1 1 1

=== GCR: (0,2) RLL ===
By extending the maximal run length to 2 adjacent 0 bits, the data rate can be improved to 4/5. This is the original IBM group coded recording variant.

Data	Encoded
0000	11001
0001	11011
0010	10010
0011	10011
0100	11101
0101	10101
0110	10110
0111	10111

Data	Encoded
1000	11010
1001	01001
1010	01010
1011	01011
1100	11110
1101	01101
1110	01110
1111	01111

Where possible (11 out of 16 codes), the bit pattern abcd is encoded by prefixing it with the complement of a: a̅abcd. In the 5 cases where this would violate one of the rules (000d or ab00), a code beginning with 11 is substituted (11bea̅, where e = a ∨ d).

Example:

Data:    0010 1101 0001 1000
Encoded: 10010011011101111010

Note that to meet the definition of (0,2) RLL, it is not sufficient only that each 5-bit code contain no more than two consecutive zeros, but it is also necessary that any pair of 5-bit codes as a combined sequentially not contain more than two consecutive zeros. That is, there must not be more than two zeros between the last one bit in the first code and the first one bit in the second code, for any two arbitrarily chosen codes. This is required because for any RLL code, the run-length limits – 0 and 2 in this case – apply to the overall modulated bitstream, not just to the components of it that represent discrete sequences of plain data bits. (This rule must hold for any arbitrary pair of codes, without exception, because the input data may be any arbitrary sequence of bits.) The IBM GCR code above meets this condition, since the maximal run length of zeros at the beginning of any 5-bit code is one, and likewise the maximal run length at the end of any code is one, making a total run length of two at the junction between adjacent codes. (An example of the maximal run length occurring between codes can be seen in the example given above, where the code for the data "0010" ends with a zero and the code for the next data, "1101", begins with a zero, forming a run of two zeros at the junction of these two 5-bit codes.)

=== MFM: (1,3) RLL ===
Modified frequency modulation begins to get interesting, because its special properties allow its bits to be written to a magnetic medium with twice the density of an arbitrary bit stream. There is a limit to how close in time flux transitions can be for reading equipment to detect them, and that constrains how closely bits can be recorded on the medium: In the worst case, with an arbitrary bit stream, there are two consecutive ones, which produces two consecutive flux transitions in time, so bits must be spaced far enough apart that there would be sufficient time between those flux transitions for the reader to detect them. But this code imposes a constraint of d = 1, i.e. there is a minimum of one zero between each two ones. This means that in the worst case, flux transitions are two bit times apart, so the bits can be twice as close together as with the arbitrary bit stream without exceeding the reader's capabilities.

This doubled recording density compensates for the 1/2 coding rate of this code (it takes two bits to represent one bit of real information) and makes it equivalent to a rate-1 code.

The encoding is very similar to the FM encoding.

Data	Encoded
0	x0
1	01

Where "x" is the complement of the stream's previously encoded bit.

Except for the clock bits not always being one, this is the same as the FM table, and that is how this code gets its name. The inserted clock bits are 0 except between two 0 data bits.

When combined with the previous n-1 bit, the resulting encoding table for each data bit n effectively becomes.

Data (n)	Data (n-1)	Encoded (n)
0	0	10
0	1	00
1	0	01
1	1	01

Example:

Data:     0 0 1 0 1 1 0 1 0 0 0 1 1 0
Encoded: x010010001010001001010010100
Clock:   x 1 0 0 0 0 0 0 0 1 1 0 0 0

=== (1,7) RLL ===
(1,7) RLL maps 2 bits of data onto 3 bits on the disk, and the encoding is done in 2- or 4-bit groups. The encoding rules are: (x, y) becomes (NOT x, x AND y, NOT y), except (x, 0, 0, y) becomes (NOT x, x AND y, NOT y, 0, 0, 0). When encoding according to the table below, the longest (last in the table) match must be used; those are exceptions handling situations where applying the earlier rules would lead to a violation of the code constraints.

Data	Encoded
00	101
01	100
10	001
11	010
00 00	101 000
00 01	100 000
10 00	001 000
10 01	010 000

Example:

Data:    0 0 1 0 1 1 0 1 0 0 0 1 1 0
Encoded: 101 001 010 100 100 000 001

=== (2,7) RLL ===
(2,7) RLL is rate-1/2 code, mapping n bits of data onto 2n bits on the disk, like MFM, but because the minimal run length is 50% longer (3 bit times instead of 2), the bits can be written faster, achieving 50% higher effective data density. The encoding is done in 2-, 3- or 4-bit groups.

Western Digital WD5010A, WD5011A, WD50C12

Data	(2,7) RLL encoded
11	1000
10	0100
000	100100
010	000100
011	001000
0011	00001000
0010	00100100

Seagate ST11R, IBM

Data	(2,7) RLL encoded
11	1000
10	0100
000	000100
010	100100
011	001000
0011	00001000
0010	00100100

Perstor Systems ADRC

Data	(2,7) RLL encoded
11	1000
10	0100
000	100100
010	000100
001	001000
0111	00001000
0110	00100100

The encoded forms begin with at most 4, and end with at most 3 zero bits, giving the maximal run length of 7.

Example:

Data:    1 1  0 1 1  0 0 1 1
Encoded: 1000 001000 00001000

=== HHH(1,13) ===
The HHH(1,13) code is a rate-2/3 code developed by three IBM researchers (Hirt, Hassner, and Heise) for use in the 16 Mbit/s IrDA VFIR physical layer. Unlike magnetic encoding, this is designed for an infrared transmitter, where a 0 bit represents "off" and a 1 bit represents "on". Because 1 bits consume more power to transmit, this is designed to limit the density of 1 bits to less than 50%. In particular, it is a (1,13|5) RLL code, where the final 5 indicates the additional constraint that there are at most 5 consecutive "10" bit pairs.

Data	Encoded
00	010
01	001
10	100
11	101
01 10	001 000
01 11	010 000
11 10	101 000
11 11	100 000
00 11 00	010 000 000
00 11 01	001 000 000
10 11 00	100 000 000
10 11 01	101 000 000
00 11 10 11	010 000 000 000
10 11 10 11	100 000 000 000

The first eight rows describe a standard (1,7) RLL code. The additional six exceptions increase the maximal run of zeros to 13 (in the legal pattern 100 000 000 000 001, which represents 10 11 10 11, followed by 01), but limit the maximal average ones density to 1/3. The longest run of 1–0 pairs is 000 101 010 101 000.

This code limits the ones density to between 1/12 and 1/3, with an average of 25.8%.

== Examples ==
For example, let us encode the bit sequence 10110010 with different encodings

Encoding	Data	Encoded
(0,1) RLL	10110010	1110111110101110
(0,2) RLL	1011 0010	01011 10010
(1,3) RLL	10110010	0100010100100100
(1,7) RLL	10 11 00 10	001 010 101 001
(2,7) RLL	10 11 0010	0100 1000 00100100
HHH(1,13)	10 11 00 10	100 000 000 100

== Densities ==
Suppose a magnetic tape can contain up to 3200 flux reversals per inch. A modified frequency modulation, or (1,3) RLL encoding, stores each data bit as two bits on tape, but since there is guaranteed to be one 0 (no flux reversal) bit between any 1 (flux reversal) bits, then it is possible to store 6400 encoded bits per inch on the tape, or 3200 data bits per inch. A (1,7) RLL encoding can also store 6400 encoded bits per inch on the tape, but since it only takes 3 encoded bits to store 2 data bits, this is 4267 data bits per inch. A (2,7) RLL encoding takes 2 encoded bits to store each data bit, but since there is guaranteed to be two 0 bits between any 1 bits, then it is possible to store 9600 encoded bits per inch on the tape, or 4800 data bits per inch.

The flux-reversal densities on hard drives are significantly greater, but the same improvements in storage density are seen by using different encoding systems.

== See also ==
- 8b/10b encoding
- Bit slip
- Group coded recording (GCR)
- Modified Frequency Modulation (MFM)
- PRML
- Eight-to-fourteen modulation and EFMplus are DC-free (2,10) RLL codes used on CDs and DVDs, respectively.
- Error correcting codes
- Line code
- Modulation
- Physical layer
- Self-synchronizing code and bit synchronization
