= Line code =

Pattern used within a communications system to represent digital data

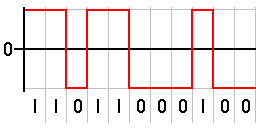
An example of coding a binary signal using rectangular pulse-amplitude modulation with polar non-return-to-zero code

An example of bipolar encoding, or AMI.

Encoding of 11011000100 in Manchester encoding

An example of differential Manchester encoding

An example of biphase mark code

An example of MLT-3 encoding

In telecommunications, a line code is a pattern of voltage, current, or photons used to represent digital data transmitted down a communication channel or written to a storage medium. This repertoire of signals is usually called a constrained code in data storage systems. Some signals are more prone to error than others as the physics of the communication channel or storage medium constrains the repertoire of signals that can be used reliably.

Common line encodings are unipolar, polar, bipolar, and Manchester code.

== Transmission and storage ==
After line coding, the signal is put through a physical communication channel, either a transmission medium or data storage medium. The most common physical channels are:

- the line-coded signal can directly be put on a transmission line, in the form of variations of the voltage or current (often using differential signaling).
- the line-coded signal (the baseband signal) undergoes further pulse shaping (to reduce its frequency bandwidth) and then is modulated (to shift its frequency) to create an RF signal that can be sent through free space.
- the line-coded signal can be used to turn on and off a light source in free-space optical communication, most commonly used in an infrared remote control.
- the line-coded signal can be printed on paper to create a bar code.
- the line-coded signal can be converted to magnetized spots on a hard drive or tape drive.
- the line-coded signal can be converted to pits on an optical disc.

Some of the more common binary line codes include:

Signal	Comments	1 state	0 state
NRZ–L	Non-return-to-zero level. This is the standard positive logic signal format used in digital circuits.	forces a high level	forces a low level
NRZ–M	Non-return-to-zero mark	forces a transition	does nothing (keeps sending the previous level)
NRZ–S	Non-return-to-zero space	does nothing (keeps sending the previous level)	forces a transition
RZ	Return to zero	goes high for half the bit period and returns to low	stays low for the entire period
Biphase–L	Manchester. Two consecutive bits of the same type force a transition at the beginning of a bit period.	forces a negative transition in the middle of the bit	forces a positive transition in the middle of the bit
Biphase–M	Variant of Differential Manchester. There is always a transition halfway between the conditioned transitions.	forces a transition	keeps level constant
Biphase–S	Differential Manchester used in Token Ring. There is always a transition halfway between the conditioned transitions.	keeps level constant	forces a transition
Differential Manchester (Alternative)	Need a Clock, always a transition in the middle of the clock period	is represented by no transition.	is represented by a transition at the beginning of the clock period.
Bipolar	The positive and negative pulses alternate.	forces a positive or negative pulse for half the bit period	keeps a zero level during bit period

An arbitrary bit pattern in various binary line code formats

Each line code has advantages and disadvantages. Line codes are chosen to meet one or more of the following criteria:

- Minimize transmission hardware
- Facilitate synchronization
- Ease error detection and correction
- Achieve a target spectral density
- Eliminate a DC component

== Disparity ==
Most long-distance communication channels cannot reliably transport a DC component. The DC component is also called the disparity, the bias, or the DC coefficient. The disparity of a bit pattern is the difference in the number of one bits vs the number of zero bits. The running disparity is the running total of the disparity of all previously transmitted bits. The simplest possible line code, unipolar, gives too many errors on such systems, because it has an unbounded DC component.

Most line codes eliminate the DC component – such codes are called DC-balanced, zero-DC, or DC-free. There are three ways of eliminating the DC component:

- Use a constant-weight code. Each transmitted codeword in a constant-weight code is designed such that every codeword that contains some positive or negative levels also contains enough of the opposite levels, such that the average level over each codeword is zero. Examples of constant-weight codes include Manchester code and Interleaved 2 of 5.
- Use a paired disparity code. Each codeword in a paired disparity code that averages to a negative level is paired with another codeword that averages to a positive level. The transmitter keeps track of the running DC buildup, and picks the codeword that pushes the DC level back towards zero. The receiver is designed so that either codeword of the pair decodes to the same data bits. Examples of paired disparity codes include alternate mark inversion, 8b/10b and 4B3T.
- Use a scrambler. For example, the scrambler specified in RFC 2615 for 64b/66b encoding.

== Polarity ==
Bipolar line codes have two polarities, are generally implemented as RZ, and have a radix of three since there are three distinct output levels (negative, positive and zero). One of the principal advantages of this type of code is that it can eliminate any DC component. This is important if the signal must pass through a transformer or a long transmission line.

Unfortunately, several long-distance communication channels have polarity ambiguity. Polarity-insensitive line codes compensate in these channels. There are three ways of providing unambiguous reception of 0 and 1 bits over such channels:

- Pair each codeword with the polarity-inverse of that codeword. The receiver is designed so that either codeword of the pair decodes to the same data bits. Examples include alternate mark inversion, Differential Manchester encoding, coded mark inversion and Miller encoding.
- differential coding each symbol relative to the previous symbol. Examples include MLT-3 encoding and NRZI.
- Invert the whole stream when inverted syncwords are detected, perhaps using polarity switching

== Run-length limited codes ==
For reliable clock recovery at the receiver, a run-length limitation may be imposed on the generated channel sequence, i.e., the maximum number of consecutive ones or zeros is bounded to a reasonable number. A clock period is recovered by observing transitions in the received sequence, so that a maximum run length guarantees sufficient transitions to assure clock recovery quality.

RLL codes are defined by four main parameters: m, n, d, k. The first two, m/n, refer to the rate of the code, while the remaining two specify the minimal d and maximal k number of zeroes between consecutive ones. This is used in both telecommunications and storage systems that move a medium past a fixed recording head.

Specifically, RLL bounds the length of stretches (runs) of repeated bits during which the signal does not change. If the runs are too long, clock recovery is difficult; if they are too short, the high frequencies might be attenuated by the communications channel. By modulating the data, RLL reduces the timing uncertainty in decoding the stored data, which would lead to the possible erroneous insertion or removal of bits when reading the data back. This mechanism ensures that the boundaries between bits can always be accurately found (preventing bit slip), while efficiently using the media to reliably store the maximal amount of data in a given space.

Early disk drives used very simple encoding schemes, such as RLL (0,1) FM code, followed by RLL (1,3) MFM code which were widely used in hard disk drives until the mid-1980s and are still used in digital optical discs such as CD, DVD, MD, Hi-MD and Blu-ray using EFM and EFMPLus codes. Higher density RLL (2,7) and RLL (1,7) codes became the de facto standards for hard disks by the early 1990s.

== Synchronization ==
Line coding should make it possible for the receiver to synchronize itself to the phase of the received signal. If the clock recovery is not ideal, then the signal to be decoded will not be sampled at the optimal times. This will increase the probability of error in the received data.

Biphase line codes require at least one transition per bit time. This makes it easier to synchronize the transceivers and detect errors, however, the bandwidth usage is greater than that of NRZ codes at the same data rate.

== Other considerations ==
A line code will typically reflect technical requirements of the transmission medium, such as optical fiber or shielded twisted pair. These requirements are unique for each medium, because each one has different behavior related to interference, distortion, capacitance and attenuation.

== Common line codes ==
- 2B1Q
- 4B3T
- 4B5B
- 6b/8b encoding
- 8b/10b encoding
- 64b/66b encoding
- 128b/130b encoding
- Alternate mark inversion (AMI)
- Coded mark inversion (CMI)
- EFMPlus, used in DVDs
- Eight-to-fourteen modulation (EFM), used in compact discs
- Hamming code
- Hybrid ternary code
- Manchester code and differential Manchester
- Mark and space
- MLT-3 encoding
- Modified AMI codes: B8ZS, B6ZS, B3ZS, HDB3
- Modified frequency modulation, Miller encoding and delay encoding
- Non-return-to-zero (NRZ)
- Non-return-to-zero, inverted (NRZI)
- Pulse-position modulation (PPM)
- Return-to-zero (RZ)
- TC-PAM

=== Optical line codes ===
- Alternate-Phase Return-to-Zero (APRZ)
- Carrier-Suppressed Return-to-Zero (CSRZ)
- Three of Six, Fiber Optical (TS-FO)

== See also ==
- Physical layer
- Self-synchronizing code and bit synchronization
