= DC bias =

Mean amplitude of a waveform in the time domain

Two sine waves, one with a DC offset (in red) and one without (in blue).

In signal processing, when describing a periodic function in the time domain, the DC bias, DC component, DC offset, or DC coefficient is the mean value of the waveform. A waveform with zero mean or no DC bias is known as a DC balanced or DC free waveform.

== Origin ==
The term originates in electronics, where DC refers to a direct current voltage. In contrast, various other non-DC frequencies are analogous to superimposed alternating current (AC) voltages or currents, hence called AC component or AC coefficients.

== Applications ==
In the design of electronic amplifier circuits, every active device has biasing to set its operating point, the steady state current and voltage on the device when no signal is applied. In bipolar transistor biasing, for example, a network of resistors is used to apply a small amount of DC to the base terminal of the transistor. The AC signal is applied at the same terminal and is amplified. The bias network is designed to preserve the applied AC signal. Similarly, amplifiers using field-effect transistors or vacuum tubes also have bias circuits. The operating point of an amplifier greatly affects its characteristics of distortion and efficiency; power amplifier classes are distinguished by the operating point set by the DC bias.

DC offset is usually undesirable when it causes clipping or other undesirable change in the operating point of an amplifier. An electrical DC bias will not pass through a transformer or capacitor; thus a simple isolation transformer or series-wired capacitor can be used to block or remove it, leaving only the AC component on the other side. In signal processing terms, DC offset can be reduced in real-time by a high-pass filter. For stored digital signals, subtracting the mean amplitude from each sample will remove the offset. Very low frequencies can look like DC bias but are called "slowly changing DC" or "baseline wander".

=== Communications systems ===
DC-balanced signals are used in communications systems to prevent bit errors when passing through circuits with capacitive coupling or transformers. Bit errors can occur when a series of 1's create a DC level that charges the coupling capacitor, bringing the signal input down incorrectly to a 0-level. In order to avoid these kinds of bit errors, most line codes are designed to produce DC-balanced signals. The most common classes of DC balanced line codes are constant-weight codes and paired-disparity codes.

=== Audio ===
In audio recording, a DC offset is an undesirable characteristic. It occurs in the capturing of sound, before it reaches the recorder, and is normally caused by defective or low-quality equipment. It results in an offset of the center of the recording waveform that can cause two main problems. Either the loudest parts of the signal will be clipped prematurely since the base of the waveform has been moved up, or inaudible low-frequency distortion will occur. Low-frequency distortion may not be audible in the initial recording, but if the waveform is resampled to a compressed or lossy digital format, such as an MP3, those corruptions may become audible.

A DC tape bias was used in early tape recorders to reduce distortion.

A DC bias is applied to the control grid of vacuum tubes in power amplifiers in order to regulate power.

=== Frequency selection ===
On a voltage-controlled oscillator (VCO), such as in a radio transmitter, selection of the center frequency of the carrier wave is done with a DC bias. For frequency modulation (FM), the AC component is the baseband audio signal plus any subcarriers. Frequency-shift keying can be done solely by changing the DC bias.

=== Waveform representation ===
The concept has been extended to any representation of a waveform and to two-dimensional transformations like the discrete cosine transform used in JPEG.

== See also ==
- Phantom power
- Root-mean-square amplitude
- Root-mean-square voltage
