= Contamination (disambiguation) =

Contamination is the presence of an unwanted constituent in another substance.

Contamination may also refer to:

== Health, environment, and technology ==
- Contamination control, generic terminology for all activities aiming to control the existence, growth and proliferation of contamination in certain areas

=== Medicine and health ===
- Biological contamination, the biological substances that threaten the health of living organisms
- Personnel contamination of cleanrooms, the shedding of and control of human skin tissue as contamination in cleanrooms in the healthcare and pharmaceutical industries
- Contaminated cannabis, potentially dangerous microorganisms in cannabis (marijuana)
- Contaminated haemophilia blood products, pathogens found in blood products
- List of medicine contamination incidents, a list of medicine contamination incidents, with articles on notable incidents
- List of contaminated cell lines, a list of cell cultures which have been cross-contaminated and overgrown by other cells

=== Food ===
- Food contamination, the presence in food of harmful chemicals or microorganisms that might cause illness
- 2008 Irish pork contamination, dioxin contamination of pork products produced in Ireland in 2008
- Food contamination in China, a chronology of food contamination and safety incidents in China from 2003 to 2014
- List of food contamination incidents, a list of worldwide food contamination incidents from ancient times to 2015
- Contaminated carrots incident, the August 2004 incident in which 45 airline passengers became ill after consuming contaminated carrots

=== Environmental ===
- Pollution, contamination of the natural environment
- Radioactive contamination, also called radiological contamination
- Radioactive contamination from the Rocky Flats Plant, a former nuclear weapons production facility near Denver, Colorado that caused radiological contamination on and outside the site
- Radioactively contaminated areas, a list of Wikipedia pages describing radioactively contaminated areas and places
- Chemical contamination (disambiguation), a disambiguation page related to chemical hazards, adulterants, and weapons
- Soil contamination, also known as soil pollution
- Contaminated land, land that contain substances that may be harmful to health or the environment
- Seed contamination, mixing agricultural seeds with undesirable seeds such as weeds or soil containing non-agricultural seeds
- Contaminated site, a page specifically describing the urban planning term Brownfield land, land which may have been contaminated from prior use
- Groundwater pollution
- Well water contamination
- Arsenic contamination of groundwater
- List of Superfund sites in the United States, a list of sites contaminated by hazardous materials that require long-term response to remediate
- Camp Lejeune water contamination, the exposure of Marine Corp members and their family members to harmful chemicals in the water on the base from 1953 to 1987
- Contaminated Land Assessment and Remediation Research Centre, a University of Edinburgh multi-disciplinary centre of excellence that existed from 1989 to 2010
- Water contamination in Crestwood, Illinois, about contamination of the Village of Crestwood, Illinois water supply over a period of 40 years
- Hinkley groundwater contamination, hexavalent chromium pollution of groundwater sources for the town of Hinkley, California – an incident dramatized in the film Erin Brockovich
- Telluric contamination, contamination of the astronomical spectra by the Earth's atmosphere

=== Industrial and technological ===
- 2007 United Kingdom petrol contamination, a 2007 situation in South East England in which silicon-contaminated petrol was thought to have damaged petrol engines in some vehicles
- Contamination Indicator Decontamination Assurance System, technology used to identify chemical contamination, a Department of Defense system
- War sand, sand that is contaminated by remains of weapons of war
- Contamination delay, the minimum time for an input change to change output in digital circuits

== Research ==
- Contaminated Gaussian, a concept in statistical modeling

== Forensics ==
- Contaminated currency, the finding of illegal drugs or other potential pathogens on paper money

== Linguistics ==
- linguistic contamination as a form of analogical change
- blend words are called contaminations in a number of languages

== Entertainment ==
- Contamination (film), 1980 science fiction horror film directed by Luigi Cozzi and starring Ian McCulloch
- Contaminator, a 1989 Italian science fiction film
- "Contamination" (Private Practice), an episode of the American television series Private Practice
- Contamination (album), 1996 album by Belgian electro-industrial act Suicide Commando
- "Contaminated" (song), 2019 song by American singer-songwriter Banks
