= Timing analysis =

Timing analysis may refer to:

- Static timing analysis, a simulation method which computes the expected timing of a synchronous digital circuit
- Dynamic timing analysis
- Statistical static timing analysis

== See also ==
- Timing attack, a type of side channel attack on a cryptosystem
