= DSPF =

DSPF may stand for:

- Detailed Standard Parasitic Format, a file format for representing parasitic parameters (namely: resistance, capacitance and inductance) of interconnections in a chip (see also: SPEF)
- Double-studded packoff flange, a type of flange
- De sua pecunia fecit (Latin for "done with his own money"; also abbreviated D.S.P.F.); in Ancient Rome, associated with public buildings financed by private donors.
