= Propagation time =

In digital circuits, propagation time is the delay of the basic inverter of a given family. Thus, it measures the speed at which such family can operate.

== See also ==
- Delay calculation
- Contamination delay
- Propagation delay
