= FO4 =

Measure of time used in digital CMOS technologies

In digital electronics, Fan-out of 4 is a measure of time used in digital CMOS technologies: the gate delay of a component with a fan-out of 4.

Fan out = C_{load} / C_{in}, where

C_{load} = total MOS gate capacitance driven by the logic gate under consideration
C_{in} = the MOS gate capacitance of the logic gate under consideration

As a delay metric, one FO4 is the delay of an inverter, driven by an inverter 4× smaller than itself, and driving an inverter 4× larger than itself. Both conditions are necessary since input signal rise/fall time affects the delay as well as output loading.

FO4 is generally used as a delay metric because such a load is generally seen in case of tapered buffers driving large loads, and approximately in any logic gate of a logic path sized for minimum delay. Also, for most technologies the optimum fanout for such buffers generally varies from 2.7 to 5.3.

A fan out of 4 is the answer to the canonical problem stated as follows: Given a fixed size inverter, small in comparison to a fixed large load, minimize the delay in driving the large load. After some math, it can be shown that the minimum delay is achieved when the load is driven by a chain of N inverters, each successive inverter ~4× larger than the previous; N ~ log_{4}(C_{load}/C_{in}).

In the absence of parasitic capacitances (drain diffusion capacitance and wire capacitance), the result is "a fan out of e" (now N ~ ln(C_{load}/C_{in}).

If the load itself is not large, then using a fan out of 4 scaling in successive logic stages does not make sense. In these cases, minimum sized transistors may be faster.

Because scaled technologies are inherently faster (in absolute terms), circuit performance can be more fairly compared using the fan out of 4 as a metric. For example, given two 64-bit adders, one implemented in a 0.5 μm technology and the other in 90 nm technology, it would be unfair to say the 90 nm adder is better from a circuits and architecture standpoint just because it has less latency. The 90 nm adder might be faster only due to its inherently faster devices. To compare the adder architecture and circuit design, it is more fair to normalize each adder's latency to the delay of one FO4 inverter.

The FO4 time for a technology is five times its RC time constant τ; therefore 5·τ = FO4.

Some examples of high-frequency CPUs with long pipeline and low stage delay: IBM Power6 has design with cycle delay of 13 FO4; clock period of Intel's Pentium 4 at 3.4 GHz is estimated as 16.3 FO4.

== See also ==
- Logical effort
- Fan-in
