= Electromagnetic field solver =

Computer programs that solve Maxwell's equations

Electromagnetic field solvers (or sometimes just field solvers) are specialized programs that solve (a subset of) Maxwell's equations directly. They form a part of the field of electronic design automation, or EDA, and are commonly used in the design of integrated circuits and printed circuit boards. They are used when a solution from first principles or the highest accuracy is required.

== Introduction ==
The extraction of parasitic circuit models is essential for various aspects of physical verification such as timing, signal integrity, substrate coupling, and power grid analysis. As circuit speeds and densities have increased, the need has grown to account accurately for parasitic effects for more extensive and more complicated interconnect structures. In addition, the electromagnetic complexity has grown as well, from resistance and capacitance to inductance, and now even full electromagnetic wave propagation. This increase in complexity has also grown for the analysis of passive devices such as integrated inductors. Electromagnetic behavior is governed by Maxwell's equations, and all parasitic extraction requires solving some form of Maxwell's equations. That form may be a simple analytic parallel plate capacitance equation or may involve a full numerical solution for a complex 3D geometry with wave propagation. In layout extraction, analytic formulas for simple or simplified geometry can be used where accuracy is less important than speed. Still, when the geometric configuration is not simple, and accuracy demands do not allow simplification, a numerical solution of the appropriate form of Maxwell's equations must be employed.

The appropriate form of Maxwell's equations is typically solved by one of two classes of methods. The first uses a differential form of the governing equations and requires the discretization (meshing) of the entire domain in which the electromagnetic fields reside. Two of the most common approaches in this first class are the finite difference (FD) and finite element (FEM) methods. The resultant linear algebraic system (matrix) that must be solved is large but sparse (contains very few non-zero entries). Sparse linear solution methods, such as sparse factorization, conjugate-gradient, or multigrid methods can be used to solve these systems, the best of which require CPU time and memory of O(N) time, where N is the number of elements in the discretization. However, most problems in electronic design automation (EDA) are open problems, also called exterior problems, and since the fields decrease slowly towards infinity, these methods can require extremely large N.

The second class of methods are integral equation methods which instead require a discretization of only electromagnetic field sources. Those sources can be physical quantities, such as the surface charge density for the capacitance problem, or mathematical abstractions resulting from applying Green's theorem. When the sources exist only on two-dimensional surfaces for three-dimensional problems, the method is often called method of moments (MoM) or boundary element method (BEM). For open problems, the sources of the field exist in a much smaller domain than the fields themselves, and thus the size of linear systems generated by integral equations methods are much smaller than FD or FEM. Integral equation methods, however, generate dense (all entries are nonzero) linear systems, making such methods preferable to FD or FEM only for small problems. Such systems require O(n^{2}) memory to store and O(n^{3}) to solve via direct Gaussian elimination or, at best, O(n^{2}) if solved iteratively. Increasing circuit speeds and densities require the solution of increasingly complicated interconnect, making dense integral equation approaches unsuitable due to these high growth rates of computational cost with increasing problem size.

In the past two decades, much work has gone into improving both the differential and integral equation approaches, as well as new approaches based on random walk methods. Methods of truncating the discretization required by the FD and FEM approaches have greatly reduced the number of elements required. Integral equation approaches have become particularly popular for interconnect extraction due to sparsification techniques, also sometimes called matrix compression, acceleration, or matrix-free techniques, which have brought nearly O(n) growth in storage and solution time to integral equation methods.

Sparsified integral equation techniques are typically used in the IC industry to solve capacitance and inductance extraction problems. The random-walk methods have become quite mature for capacitance extraction. For problems requiring the solution of the full Maxwell's equations (full-wave), both differential and integral equation approaches are common.

== See also ==
- Computational electromagnetics
- Electronic design automation
- Integrated circuit design
- Standard Parasitic Exchange Format
- Teledeltos
