= Resistance paper =

Paper impregnated or coated with a conductive substance

Resistance paper, also known as conductive paper and by the trade name Teledeltos paper is paper impregnated or coated with a conductive substance such that the paper exhibits a uniform and known surface resistivity. Resistance paper and conductive ink were commonly used as an analog two-dimensional electromagnetic field solver. Teledeltos paper is a particular type of resistance paper.
