= Impedance =

Impedance is the complex-valued generalization of resistance. It may refer to:

- Acoustic impedance, a constant related to the propagation of sound waves in an acoustic medium
- Electrical impedance, the ratio of the voltage phasor to the electric current phasor, a measure of the opposition to time-varying electric current in an electric circuit
  - High impedance, when only a small amount of current is allowed through
  - Characteristic impedance of a transmission line
  - Impedance (accelerator physics), a characterization of the self interaction of a charged particle beam
  - Nominal impedance, approximate designed impedance
  - Impedance matching, the adjustment of input impedance and output impedance
- Mechanical impedance, a measure of opposition to motion of a structure subjected to a force
- Wave impedance, a constant related to electromagnetic wave propagation in a medium
  - Impedance of free space, a universal constant and the simplest case of a wave impedance
