= William Elmore =

William Elmore may refer to:

- William Augustus Elmore (1812–1890), lawyer and judge in New Orleans, Louisiana
- William Cronk Elmore (1909–2003), American physicist, educator, and author
