= Optical medium =

Medium through which electromagnetic waves propagate

In optics, an optical medium is material through which light and other electromagnetic waves propagate. It is a form of transmission medium. The permittivity and permeability of the medium define how electromagnetic waves propagate in it.

== Properties ==
The optical medium has an intrinsic impedance, given by

$$\eta = {E_x \over H_y}$$

where $E_x$ and $H_y$ are the electric field and magnetic field, respectively. In a region with no electrical conductivity, the expression simplifies to:

$$\eta = \sqrt{\mu \over \varepsilon}\ .$$

For example, in free space the intrinsic impedance is called the characteristic impedance of vacuum, denoted Z_{0}, and

$$Z_0 = \sqrt{\mu_0 \over \varepsilon_0}\ .$$

Waves propagate through a medium with velocity $c_w = \nu \lambda$, where $\nu$ is the frequency and $\lambda$ is the wavelength of the electromagnetic waves. This equation also may be put in the form

$$c_w = {\omega \over k}\ ,$$

where $\omega$ is the angular frequency of the wave and $k$ is the wavenumber of the wave. In electrical engineering, the symbol $\beta$, called the phase constant, is often used instead of $k$.

The propagation velocity of electromagnetic waves in free space, an idealized standard reference state (like absolute zero for temperature), is conventionally denoted by c_{0}:

$$c_0 = {1 \over \sqrt{\varepsilon_0 \mu_0}}\ ,$$
where $\varepsilon_0$ is the electric constant and $~ \mu_0 \$ is the magnetic constant.

For a general introduction, see Serway For a discussion of synthetic media, see Joannopoulus.

== See also ==
- Čerenkov radiation
- Electromagnetic spectrum
- Electromagnetic radiation
- Optics
- SI units
- Free space
- Metamaterial
- Photonic crystal
- Photonic crystal fiber
