= Timing margin =

Electronics term

Timing margin is an electronics term that defines the difference between the actual change in a signal and the latest time at which the signal can change in order for an electronic circuit to function correctly. It is used in the design of digital electronics.

== Illustration ==
Timing Margin Illustration

In this image, the lower signal is the clock and the upper signal is the data. Data is recognized by the circuit at the positive edge of the clock. There are two time intervals illustrated in this image. One is the setup time, and the other is the timing margin. The setup time is illustrated in red in this image; the timing margin is illustrated in green.

The edges of the signals can shift around in a real-world electronic system for various reasons. If the clock and the data signal are shifted relative to each other, this may increase or reduce the timing margin; as long as the data signal changes before the setup time is entered, the data will be interpreted correctly. If it is known from experience that the signals can shift relative to each other by as much as 2 microseconds, for instance, designing the system with at least 2 microseconds of timing margin will prevent incorrect interpretation of the data signal by the receiver.

If the physical design of the circuit is changed, for example by giving more wire that the clock signal is transmitted on, the edge of the data signal will move closer to the positive edge of the clock signal, reducing the timing margin. If the signals have been designed with enough timing margin, only the correct data will be received.

== See also ==
- Static timing analysis
