= William Cronk Elmore =

American physicist (1909–2003)

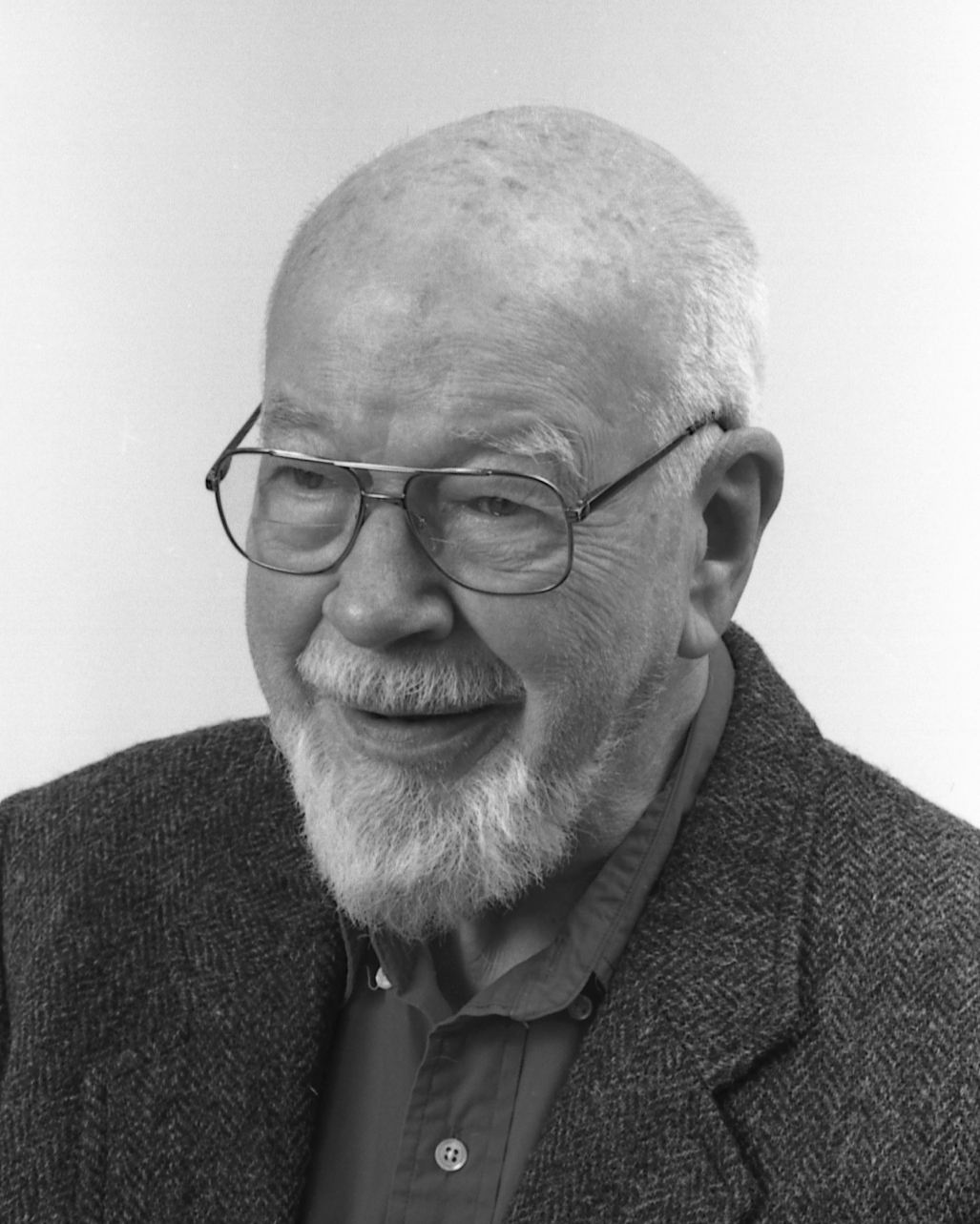
- William (Bill) Cronk Elmore in 1995
- Born: September 16, 1909; Montour Falls, New York
- Died: January 21, 2003 (aged 93); Newtown Square, PA
- Resting place: Montour Falls, New York
- Education: Lehigh University; Yale University
- Known for: Elmore delay
- Scientific career
- Fields: physics
- Workplaces: Los Alamos National Laboratory; Massachusetts Institute of Technology; Swarthmore College
- Thesis: Surface Magnetization of Ferromagnetic Crystals (1935)

William Cronk Elmore (September 16, 1909 – January 23, 2003) was an American physicist, educator, and author who is best known for his work on and related to the Manhattan project during World War II and as a professor of physics at Swarthmore College, PA from 1938 to 1974. Bill Elmore authored two influential books during his life, Electronics-Experimental Techniques with Matthew Sands and the Physics of Waves with Mark Heald. He is also known for deriving a simple approximation for the delay through an RC network, known as the Elmore delay.

== Early life and education ==
Elmore was born in Montour Falls, New York, to Thaddeus Perceval Elmore and Grace Cronk Elmore. Elmore had two sisters, Mary Elmore (b. 1902, d. 1907) and Eleanor Elmore (b. 1912, d. 2010). As a young man, Bill spent many of his days outside with his boy scout troop, experimenting with electronics and other technology, and building crystal radios. He attended Cook Academy in Montour Falls, New York, and was the valedictorian upon his graduation in 1928. He earned a B.S. in Engineering Physics from Lehigh University (Phi Beta Kappa) in 1932 and a Ph.D. from Yale in 1935. Elmore began his career as a physics instructor at the Massachusetts Institute of Technology from 1935 to 1938. In 1936, Elmore married Barbara Page, the daughter of the Yale University physics professor, Leigh Page. Bill and Barbara were married for the next 66 years. They had 4 children, Mary-Leigh (b. 1939), David (b. 1945), Elizabeth (b. 1947, d. 2015), and Page (b. 1959).

== World War II ==
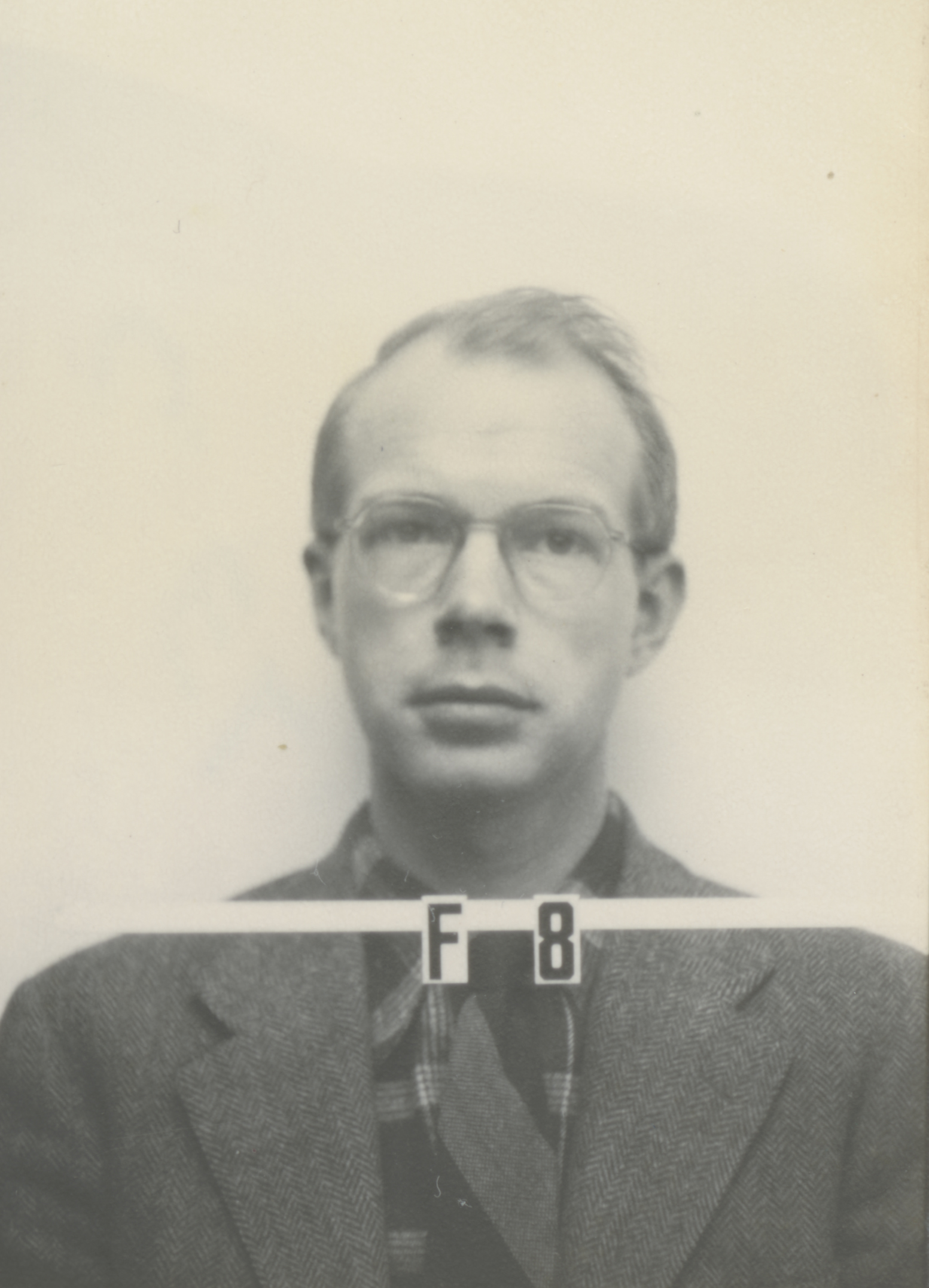
Elmore's Los Alamos badge

Elmore was recruited to work on the Manhattan Project at Los Alamos in 1943. He played a major role in developing electronic circuits to handle the fast-pulse signals needed in the development of the atomic bomb. He also developed the electronics used to measure the strength of the first atomic test at Trinity test in New Mexico. At Trinity on July 16, 1945, Elmore observed the blast from the closest position of any observer, laying on a rubber mat beside J. Robert Oppenheimer behind a temporary wall of lead bricks and holding a piece of welding glass in front of his eyes. War era letters Barbara Page wrote to her mother and other family members detail the daily life of Elmore and his family while living in Los Alamos with the other Manhattan Project scientists, such as Enrico Fermi.

In 1946, Elmore and Matthew Sands wrote Electronics: Experimental Techniques, which was published in 1949 by McGraw-Hill as part of the National Nuclear Energy Series. This book covered pre-transistor electronics including advances developed by the United States' war-time Atomic Energy Program, and became a standard reference for post-war instrumentation, influencing a generation of science and engineering students in the 1950s.

In 1957, Elmore returned to Los Alamos to work with the controlled fusion group. He was a delegate to the second Atoms for Peace Conference in Geneva.

== Swarthmore College ==
In 1938, Elmore joined Swarthmore's physics faculty, retiring in 1974. He served as department chair from 1948 to 1968. Despite his clear potential for advancing theoretical and experimental physics, at Swarthmore, Elmore was known for developing (and publishing) laboratory experiments that effectively taught students the fundamentals of physics. Elmore and Heald co-wrote the 1969 textbook Physics of Waves. In 1965, Elmore received a Distinguished Service Citation from the American Association of Physics Teachers and was elected a fellow of the American Physical Society.
