= Contamination Indicator Decontamination Assurance System =

Devices for identifying chemical weapons

The Contamination Indicator Decontamination Assurance System (CIDAS) is a technology used to identify chemical contamination. CIDAS is meant to help soldiers by detecting trace levels and finding the exact location of chemical weapon agents.

CIDAS is a component of a larger U.S. government initiative, run by the Joint Project Manager Protection at the Department of Defense, to improve decontamination processes associated with chemical, biological, and non-traditional warfare agents. Programs under this umbrella include the Joint Sensitive Equipment Wipe, General Purpose Decontaminants, and CIDAS.

== Purpose ==
The technology is designed primarily for government use, specifically on equipment such as tactical vehicles, ship surfaces, and weapons. The primary objective of CIDAS is the capability to detect trace levels of chemical warfare agents on surfaces before and after personnel decontaminate the surfaces "during Detailed Equipment Decontamination (DED) operations." One component of CIDAS is an applicator that is used to show chemical agents, specifically nerve and blister agents.

== Development history ==
In 2011, the U.S. Army product manager for the Decontamination Family of Systems (DFoS) began a market research project to identify potential prototype CIDAS technologies that could help soldiers locate chemical and biological warfare agents (CBWA), non-traditional agents (NTAs) and toxic industrial chemicals (TICs) on military equipment and vehicles.

After public input, the U.S. Army Contracting Command Aberdeen Proving Ground (ACC-APG) Contracting Center issued a request for proposal (RFP) in early 2013.

In 2014, the Joint Project Manager of Protection of the Joint Program Executive Office of Chemical and Biological Defense (JPEO-CBD) announced that it would seek two specific CIDAS devices to be used in level four "Mission Oriented Protective Posture gear." One device would be under 12 pounds and other device would be under 24 pounds, and both devices would be required to detect agents in under 5 minutes.
