= Metallic sediment in the Normandy landing beaches =

Sand containing projectile remnants

The first discovery of likely man-made metals in the sands of the Normandy beaches was made in 2011 using a single sample taken from Omaha Beach in 1988. The metal sediment making up 4% of the beach sand was speculatively identified as shrapnel dating to the Normandy Landings. A second survey conducted in 2024 and 2025 took 460 samples for analysis of metallic grain abundance, size and morphology, and concluded that metallic grains made up an average of 0.4% of the total sediment across all five D-Day beaches, and identified a number of potential sources from the Second World War.

== First Assessment ==
In 2011, Dr. Earle McBride, a researcher studying sandstone diagenesis and the textual and compositional maturation of sand during transportation, mixed a single sample collected from Omaha Beach in 1988 with a blue epoxy, creating an "artificial sandstone", before slicing it into thin sections. Utilising an optical microscope and an external light source, shiny, opaque grains could be identified. Although wave action had elicited rounding on the edges of some coarser grains, the shard-like angularity and corrosion of both coarse and fine grains suggested these grains were man-made. It is believed that the roughness of said grains was imparted by microporous surfaces produced during production and corrosion products post-explosion. Corrosion products are believed to have been a mixture of hematite, other iron oxides and hydrates (likely goethite), mineral grains, and bacteria. This inspection, alongside tests revealing that the grains were magnetic, led McBride to assume these grains were pieces of shrapnel. 4% of the sand in the sample was composed of shrapnel particles ranging in size between 0.06 millimetres (0.0024 in) and 1 mm (0.039 in). Researchers also discovered trace amounts of iron and glass beads in the sand, which they theorised may have originated from the intense heat unleashed by munitions explosions in the air and sand.

== Second Assessment ==
In June 2024 and April 2025, Samuel Hudson, Erin Pemberton, Dallin Laycock, Glen Burridge, Kassandra Ramirez, Sydney Crockett, Cassidy Grover, Olivia Tatum, Julie Robinson and Austin Toner collected 460 surface and subsurface samples from all five of the D-Day beaches. Analysis identified an average of 0.4% metallic sediment in the sand, with each beach yielding different concentrations (Utah Beach: 0.21%, Omaha Beach: 0.18%, Gold Beach: 0.24%, Juno Beach: 0.06% and Sword Beach: 0.66%). The study concluded that whilst the metallic sediments were most likely man-made, the absence of control sites limited the exclusion of non-military origins and iron and steel foundries on the coast, industrial activities in Caen and Rouen and shipbuilding were all possible contributing factors. However, accounting for the hydrology of the Seine Bay it was concluded likely that a portion of the metallic sediment originated from the Normandy Landings.
