= Impedance of free space =

Physical constant; ratio of electric to magnetic field strength in a vacuum

In electromagnetism, the impedance of free space, Z_{0}, is a physical constant relating the magnitudes of the electric and magnetic fields of electromagnetic radiation travelling through free space. That is,
$$Z_0 = \frac{|\mathbf E|}{|\mathbf H|},$$
where |E| is the electric field strength, and |H| is the magnetic field strength. Its presently accepted value is

Z_{0} = 376.730313412(59) Ω,

where Ω is the ohm, the SI unit of electrical resistance. The impedance of free space (that is, the wave impedance of a plane wave in free space) is equal to the product of the vacuum permeability μ_{0} and the speed of light in vacuum c. Before 2019, the values of both these constants were taken to be exact (they were given in the definitions of the ampere and the metre respectively), and the value of the impedance of free space was therefore likewise taken to be exact. However, with the revision of the SI that came into force on 20 May 2019, the impedance of free space as expressed with an SI unit is subject to experimental measurement because while the speed of light in vacuum remains exactly defined, the use of an exact value of μ_{0} as the definition of the ampere has been replaced by a fixed value for the elementary charge, i.e. the charge on the electron.

== Terminology ==
The analogous quantity for a plane wave travelling through a dielectric medium is called the intrinsic impedance of the medium and designated η (eta). Hence Z_{0} is sometimes referred to as the intrinsic impedance of free space, and given the symbol η_{0}. It has numerous other synonyms, including:

- wave impedance of free space,
- the vacuum impedance,
- intrinsic impedance of vacuum,
- characteristic impedance of vacuum,
- wave resistance of free space.

== Relation to other constants ==
From the above definition, and the plane wave solution to Maxwell's equations,
$$Z_0 = \frac{|\mathbf E|}{|\mathbf H|} = \mu_0 c = \sqrt{\frac{\mu_0}{\varepsilon_0}} = \frac{1}{\varepsilon_0 c},$$
where

μ_{0} ≈ 12.566×10^{−7} H/m is the magnetic constant, also known as the permeability of free space,
ε_{0} ≈ 8.854×10^{−12} F/m is the electric constant, also known as the permittivity of free space,
c is the speed of light in free space,

The reciprocal of Z_{0} is sometimes referred to as the admittance of free space and represented by the symbol Y_{0}.

== Historical exact value ==
Between 1948 and 2019, the SI unit the ampere was defined by choosing the numerical value of μ_{0} to be exactly 4π × 10^{−7} H/m. Similarly, since 1983 the SI metre has been defined relative to the second by choosing the value of c_{0} to be 299792458 m/s. Consequently, until the 2019 revision,

$Z_0 = \mu_0 c = 4\pi \times 29.979\,2458~\Omega$ exactly,

or

$Z_0 = \mu_0 c = \pi \times 119.916\,9832~\Omega$ exactly,

or

$$Z_0 = 376.730\,313\,461\,77\ldots~\Omega.$$

This chain of dependencies changed when the ampere was redefined on 20 May 2019.

== Approximation as 120π ohms ==
It is very common in textbooks and papers written before about 1990 to substitute the approximate value 120π ohms for Z_{0}. This is equivalent to taking the speed of light c to be precisely 3×10^{8} m/s in conjunction with the then-current definition of μ_{0} as 4π × 10^{−7} H/m. For example, Cheng 1989 states that the radiation resistance of a Hertzian dipole is

$R_r \approx 80 \pi^2 \left( \frac{l}{\lambda}\right)^2$ (result in ohms; not exact).

This practice may be recognized from the resulting discrepancy in the units of the given formula. Consideration of the units, or more formally dimensional analysis, may be used to restore the formula to a more exact form, in this case to

$$R_r = \frac{2 \pi}{3} Z_0 \left( \frac{l}{\lambda}\right)^2.$$

== See also ==
- Electromagnetic wave equation
- Mathematical descriptions of the electromagnetic field
- Near and far field
- Sinusoidal plane-wave solutions of the electromagnetic wave equation
- Space cloth
- Vacuum
- Wave impedance
