= Chemical contamination =

Chemical contamination may refer to:

- The chemical hazards produced by the presence of a chemical
- The use of an adulterant
- The use of a chemical weapon
