= Dynamic timing analysis =

Method of testing circuit timing

Dynamic timing analysis is a verification of circuit timing by applying test vectors to the circuit. It is a form of simulation that tests circuit timing in its functional context.

== See also ==
- Dynamic timing verification
- Static timing analysis
