= Parasitic impedance =

Undesired resistance, inductance, or capacitance within electrical components

Parasitic elements of a typical electronic component package.

In electrical networks, a parasitic impedance is a circuit element (resistance, inductance or capacitance) which is not desirable in an electrical component for its intended purpose. For instance, a resistor is designed to possess resistance, but will also possess unwanted parasitic capacitance.

Parasitic impedances are unavoidable. All conductors possess resistance and inductance and the principles of duality ensure that where there is inductance, there will also be capacitance. Component designers will strive to minimise parasitic elements but are unable to eliminate them. Discrete components will often have some parasitic values detailed on their datasheets to aid circuit designers in compensating for unwanted effects.

The most commonly seen manifestations of parasitic impedances in components are in the parasitic inductance and resistance of the component leads and the parasitic capacitance of the component packaging. For wound components such as inductors and transformers, there is additionally the important effect of parasitic capacitance that exists between the individual turns of the windings. This winding parasitic capacitance will cause the inductor to act as a resonant circuit at some frequency, known as the self-resonant frequency, at which point (and all frequencies above) the component is useless as an inductor.

Parasitic impedances are often modelled as lumped components in equivalent circuits, but this is not always adequate. For instance, the inter-winding capacitance mentioned above is really a distributed element along the whole length of the winding and not a capacitor in one particular place. Designers sometimes take advantage of parasitic effects to achieve a desired function in a component, see for instance helical resonator or analog delay line.

Nonlinear parasitic elements can also arise. The term is commonly used to describe parasitic structures formed on an integrated circuit whereby an unwanted semiconductor device is formed from p-n junctions which belong to two or more intended devices or functions. The parasitic effects in the dielectric of capacitors and parasitic magnetic effects in inductors also include non-linear effects that vary with frequency or voltage and cannot be adequately modelled by linear lumped or distributed components.
