= Teledeltos =

Electrically conductive paper

Teledeltos paper is an electrically conductive paper. It is formed by a coating of carbon on one side of a sheet of paper, giving one black and one white side. Western Union developed Teledeltos paper in the late 1940s (several decades after it was already in use for mathematical modelling) for use in spark printer based fax machines and chart recorders.

Teledeltos paper has several uses within engineering that are far removed from its original use in spark printers. Many of these use the paper to model the distribution of electric potential and other scalar fields.

== Use ==
Teledeltos provides a sheet of uniform isotropic resistivity. As it is inexpensive and easily cut to shape, it may be used to make resistors of any shape needed. The paper backing is an insulator. These shapes are usually made to represent or model real-world examples of a two-dimensional scalar fields, such as an electric field, or other fields following the linear distribution rules.

The resistivity of Teledeltos is around 6 kilohms / square. (Note: Note that the resistivity units for a two-dimensional sheet are ohms / square ($\Omega/\Box$), not the ohm metre (Ω⋅m)s that would be used for the resistivity of a bulk resistor.) This is low enough that it may be used with safe low voltages, yet high enough that the currents remain low, avoiding problems with contact resistance.

Connections are made to the paper by applying areas of silver-loaded conductive paint and attaching wires to these areas, often with spring clips. Each painted area has a sufficiently low resistivity (relative to the carbon) and to be assumed to be a constant voltage. With the voltages applied, the current flow through the sheet will emulate the field distribution. Voltages may be measured within the sheet by applying a voltmeter probe (relative to a known electrodes) or current flows may be measured. As the sheet's resistivity is constant, the simplest way to measure a current flow is to use a small two-probe voltmeter to measure the voltage difference between the probes. As their spacing is known, and the resistivity, the resistance between them and (by Ohm's law) the current density may be determined.

A sheet that is large in comparison to the experimental area is usually sufficient for modeling an infinite field.

== Modelling fields by analogy ==
Although the modelling of electric fields is itself directly useful in some fields such as thermionic valve design, the main practical use of the broader technique is for modelling fields of other quantities. This technique may be applied to any field that follows the same linear rules as Ohm's law for bulk resistivity. This includes heat flow, some optics and some aspects of Newtonian mechanics. It is not usually applicable to fluid dynamics, owing to viscosity and compressibility effects, or to high-intensity optics where non-linear effects become apparent. It may be applicable to some mechanical problems involving homogeneous and isotropic materials such as metals, but not to composites.

Before the use of Teledeltos, a similar technique had been used for modelling gas flows, where a shallow tray of copper sulphate solution was used as the medium, with copper electrodes at each side. Barriers within the model could be sculpted from wax. Being a liquid, this was far less convenient. Stanley Hooker describes its use pre-war, although he also notes that compressibility effects could be modelled in this way, by sculpting the base of the tank to give additional depth and thus conductivity locally.

One of the most important applications is for thermal modelling. Voltage is the analog of temperature and current flow that of heat flow. If the boundaries of a heatsink model are both painted with conductive paint to form two separate electrodes, each may be held at a voltage to represent the temperatures of some internal heat source (such as a microprocessor chip) and the external ambient temperature. Potentials within the heatsink represent internal temperatures and current flows represent heat flow. In many cases the internal heat source may be modelled with a constant current source, rather than a voltage, giving a better analogy of power loss as heat, rather than assuming a simple constant temperature. If the external airflow is restricted, the 'ambient' electrode may be subdivided and each section connected to a common voltage supply through a resistor or current limiter, representing the proportionate or maximum heat flow capacity of that airstream.

As heatsinks are commonly manufactured from extruded aluminium sections, the two-dimensional paper is not usually a serious limitation. In some cases, such as pistons for internal combustion engines, three-dimensional modelling may be required. This has been performed, in a manner analogous to Teledeltos paper, by using volume tanks of a conductive electrolyte.

This thermal modelling technique is useful in many branches of mechanical engineering such as heatsink or radiator design and die casting.

The development of computational modelling and finite element analysis has reduced the use of Teledeltos, such that the technique is now obscure and the materials can be hard to obtain. Its use is still highly valuable in teaching, as the technique gives a very obvious method for measuring fields and offers immediate feedback as the shape of an experimental setup is changed, encouraging a more fundamental understanding.

== Sensors ==
Teledeltos can also be used to make sensors, either directly as an embedded resistive element or indirectly, as part of their design process.

=== Resistive sensors ===
A piece of Teledeltos with conductive electrodes at each end makes a simple resistor. Its resistance is slightly sensitive to applied mechanical strain by bending or compression, but the paper substrate is not robust enough to make a reliable sensor for long-term use.

A more common resistive sensor is in the form of a potentiometer. A long, thin resistor with an applied voltage may have a conductive probe slid along its surface. The voltage at the probe depends on its position between the two end contacts. Such a sensor may form the keyboard for a simple electronic musical instrument like a Tannerin or Stylophone.

A similar linear sensor uses two strips of Teledeltos, placed face to face. Pressure on the back of one (finger pressure is enough) presses the two conductive faces together to form a lower resistance contact. This may be used in similar potentiometric fashion to the conductive probe, but without requiring the special probe. This may be used as a classroom demonstration for another electronic musical instrument, with a ribbon controller keyboard, such as the Monotron. If crossed electrodes are used on each piece of Teledeltos, a two-dimensional resistive touchpad may be demonstrated.

=== Capacitive sensors ===
Although Teledeltos is not used to manufacture capacitive sensors, its field modelling abilities also allow it to be used to determine the capacitance of arbitrarily shaped electrodes during sensor design.

== See also ==
- Finite element analysis
- Hydraulic analogy
- Space cloth
