= Parasitic capacitance =

Usually unwanted capacitance in a circuit

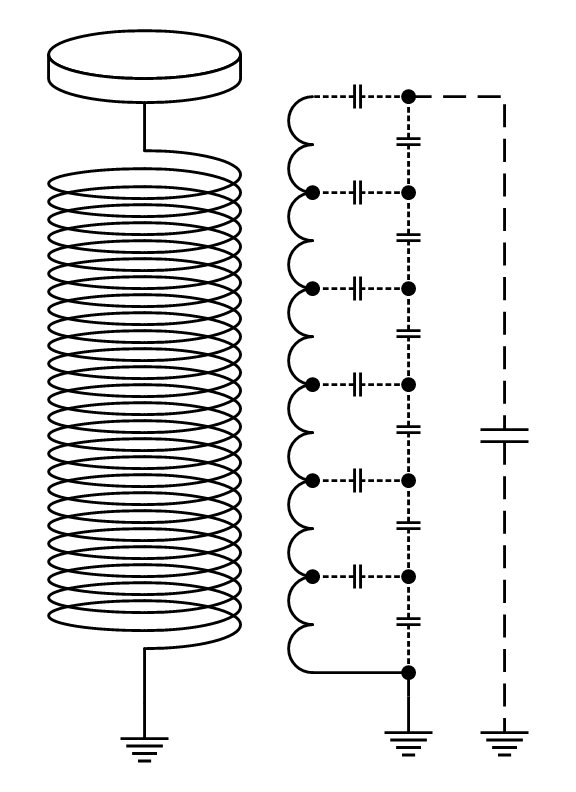
Figure 1: Stray capacitances are often drawn with dashed lines. This equivalent circuit of part of a Tesla coil has stray capacitance between each winding and one to ground.

Parasitic capacitance or stray capacitance is the unavoidable and usually unwanted capacitance that exists between the parts of an electronic component or circuit simply because of their proximity to each other. When two electrical conductors at different voltages are close together, the electric field between them causes electric charge to be stored on them; this effect is capacitance.

All practical circuit elements such as inductors, diodes, and transistors have internal capacitance, which can cause their behavior to depart from that of ideal circuit elements. Additionally, there is always some capacitance between any two conductors; this can be significant with closely spaced conductors, such as adjacent wires or printed circuit board traces. The parasitic capacitance between the turns of an inductor (e.g. Figure 1) or other wound component is often described as self-capacitance. However, in electromagnetics, the term self-capacitance more correctly refers to a different phenomenon: the capacitance of a conductive object without reference to another object.

Parasitic capacitance is a significant problem in high-frequency circuits and is often the factor limiting the operating frequency and bandwidth of electronic components and circuits.

== Description ==
When two conductors at different potentials are close to one another, they are affected by each other's electric field and store opposite electric charges, forming a capacitor. Changing the potential $V$ between the conductors requires a current $i$ into or out of the conductors to charge or discharge them:

$$i = C \frac{dV}{dt} \, ,$$

where $C$ is the capacitance between the conductors. For example, an inductor often acts as though it includes a parallel capacitor, because of its closely spaced windings. When a potential difference exists across the coil, wires lying adjacent to each other are at different potentials. They act like the plates of a capacitor, and store charge. Any change in the voltage across the coil requires extra current to charge and discharge their small capacitances. When the voltage changes only slowly, as in low-frequency circuits, the extra current is usually negligible, but when the voltage changes quickly the extra current is larger and can affect the operation of the circuit.

Coils for high frequencies are often basket-wound to minimize parasitic capacitance.

== Effects ==
At low frequencies parasitic capacitance can usually be ignored, but in high frequency circuits it can be a major problem. In amplifier circuits with extended frequency response, parasitic capacitance between the output and the input can act as a feedback path, causing the circuit to oscillate at high frequency. These unwanted oscillations are called parasitic oscillations.

In high frequency amplifiers, parasitic capacitance can combine with stray inductance such as component leads to form resonant circuits, also leading to parasitic oscillations. In all inductors, the parasitic capacitance will resonate with the inductance at some high frequency to make the inductor self-resonant; this is called the self-resonant frequency. Above this frequency, the inductor actually has capacitive reactance.

The capacitance of the load circuit attached to the output of op amps can reduce their bandwidth. High-frequency circuits require special design techniques such as careful separation of wires and components, guard rings, ground planes, power planes, shielding between input and output, termination of lines, and striplines to minimize the effects of unwanted capacitance.

In closely spaced cables and computer busses, parasitic capacitive coupling can cause crosstalk, which means the signal from one circuit bleeds into another, causing interference and unreliable operation.

Electronic design automation computer programs, which are used to design commercial printed circuit boards, can calculate the parasitic capacitance and other parasitic effects of both components and circuit board traces, and include them in simulations of circuit operation. This is called parasitic extraction.

=== Miller capacitance ===
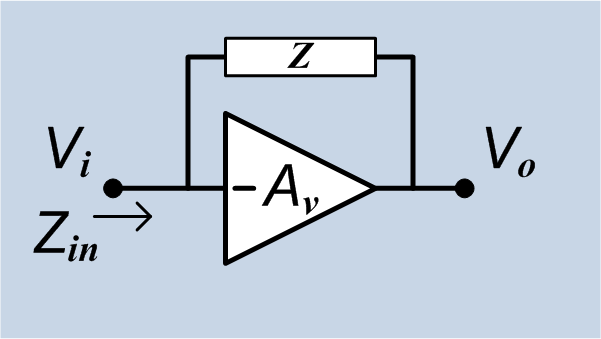
Figure 1: The Miller effect causes a feedback impedance $Z$ between the input and output of an amplifier to apparently be multiplied by a little more than the amplifier's gain $A_v$ when viewed as an input impedance $Z_{in}$.

Parasitic capacitance in an inverting amplifier component like a transistor is especially problematic because it is multiplied by the gain of the amplifier due to the Miller effect. Assume the ideal inverting amplifier with gain of $A_\nu$ in Figure 2 has a parasitic capacitance between the amplifier's input and output as the feedback impedance $(Z{=}C_\text{parasitic})$. If the amplifier itself has infinite input impedance, the current from the input terminal through $Z$ is:

$$i_\text{Z} = C_\text{parasitic} \, {d \over dt}(V_\text{i} - V_\text{o}) \,$$
$$i_\text{Z} = C_\text{parasitic} \, {d \over dt}(V_\text{i} + A_\nu \, V_\text{i}) \,$$
$$i_\text{Z} = \underbrace{(1 + A_\nu) \, C_\text{parasitic}}_{C_\text{Miller}} \, {dV_\text{i} \over dt} \, .$$

Even a small parasitic capacitance is problematic because the Miller effect multiplies it by $1 + A_\nu$ (or approximately $A_\nu$ for amplifiers with high gain) when viewed as an input capacitance $C_\text{Miller}$.

==== Impact on frequency response ====
If the input circuit has an impedance to ground of $R_i$, then (assuming no other amplifier poles) the output of the amplifier is

$$V_\text{o} = \frac{A_\nu}{1 + j\omega R_\text{i}C_\text{Miller} }V_\text{i} \, ,$$

which depends on the angular frequency $\omega = 2 \pi f$. This acts as a low-pass filter with a cutoff frequency that limits the amplifier's bandwidth to:

$$f_\text{cutoff} = {1 \over 2\pi R_\text{i}C_\text{Miller}}  = {1 \over  2\pi R_\text{i}C_\text{parasitic} \, (1 + A_\nu)} \, .$$

The voltage gain of modern transistors can be 10–100 or even higher, and for op amps are orders of magnitudes higher, so Miller capacitance (first noted in vacuum tubes by John Milton Miller in 1920) is a significant limitation on the high frequency performance of amplifying devices. The screen grid was added to triode vacuum tubes in the 1920s to reduce parasitic capacitance between the control grid and the plate, creating the tetrode, which resulted in a great increase in operating frequency. In bipolar junction transistors, the parasitic capacitances between the base and collector or emitter have voltage dependence too.

== See also ==
- Parasitic impedance
- Decoupling capacitor
