= Scott Adams Scoops =

1987 video game compilation

- Publisher: U.S. Gold
- Designer: Scott Adams
- Platforms: BBC Micro, ZX Spectrum, Commodore 64/128, Commodore 16, Plus/4
- Release: 1987
- Genre: Text adventure
- Mode: Single-player

Scott Adams Scoops is a compilation of video games designed by Scott Adams and published by U.S. Gold for a variety of home computers: Pirate Adventure, Strange Odyssey, Voodoo Castle, and Buckaroo Banzai.

== Release ==
The compilation includes text–only versions of four games designed by Scott Adams and previously published by Adams' Adventure International: Pirate Adventure (1979), Strange Odyssey (1979), Voodoo Castle (1979), and Buckaroo Banzai (1985). Buckaroo Banzai (co-written with Philip Case) is based on the 1984 film The Adventures of Buckaroo Banzai Across the 8th Dimension and was previously only released for the TI-99/4A.

== Reception ==
Reception

Review scores
Publication	Score
Sinclair User	3/5
Computer Gamer	58%

Scott Adams Scoops received mixed to negative reviews. Peter Sweasey from ZX Computing Monthly rated the game as "Grim". A reviewer for Computer and Video Games considered Buckaroo Banzai to be their least favorite game by Scott Adams.
