= Questprobe featuring Spider-Man =

1984 video game

- Developer: Adventure International
- Publisher: Adventure International
- Designer: Scott Adams
- Artists: Al Milgrom; Teoman Irmak
- Series: Questprobe
- Platforms: Acorn Electron; Apple II; Atari 8-bit; BBC Micro; Commodore 64; Commodore 16; Dragon 32; MS-DOS; ZX Spectrum
- Release: December 1984
- Genre: Graphic adventure
- Mode: Single-player

Questprobe: Featuring Spider-Man is graphic adventure game and the second video game in the Questprobe series. It was published by Adventure International in December 1984 for home computers.

== Gameplay ==
The player takes the role of Spider-Man, with powers including super strength and the ability to climb walls. Unlike previous releases, this game was not limited to simple verb/noun input, and could accept complex sentences.

== Plot ==
Spider-Man encounters The Lizard.

Spider-Man begins the game imprisoned in a skyscraper which he must explore. He encounters characters such as Sandman, Hydro-Man, and Ringmaster. The player must solve puzzles and collect gems. He also encounters Madame Web and Lizard.

== Development and release ==
In 1983, Marvel Comics and Adventure International entered an agreement in which Marvel would grant Adventure a ten-year license to create a series of adventure games based on Marvel's characters. The first instalment of the series, Questprobe featuring The Hulk, was released on 6 June 1984 and was accompanied by a comic of the same title.

Questprobe featuring Spider-Man, was launched at the Personal Computer World show in London in September 1984 although the game was still in its testing stage.

This was the second graphically illustrated adventure in the Questprobe series by Scott Adams. The versions for Spectrum and Commodore 64 had graphics, but the other versions did not. The game comes with a mini-comic to set the scene for the plot.

== Reception ==
Reception

Award
Publication	Award
Crash	Smash!

Sinclair Programs said that "the adventure itself is excellent, with enough puzzles appearing immediately to keep any adventurer involved and intrigued".

Personal Computer Games said that "the game is initially somewhat easier than The Hulk, but rapidly becomes very challenging. The White Wizard is currently deeply involved and urges other adventurers to join him".

Home Computing Weekly wrote: "Classy, but rather over-priced: recommended for masochists and adventure freaks!"

Paul Bond for Your Computer wrote: "Spider-man is the second adventure in the Questprobe series, a combination of comics and computer adventure games that allow you to become your favourite Marvel superhero".
