= Ghost Town (video game) =

1980 video game

- Developer: Adventure International
- Publisher: Adventure International
- Designer: Scott Adams
- Series: Adventure
- Platforms: Apple II, Atari 8-bit, Acorn Electron, BBC Micro, Commodore 64, Dragon 32/64, Exidy Sorcerer, TI-99/4A, TRS-80, VIC-20, ZX Spectrum
- Release: 1980
- Genre: Interactive fiction
- Mode: Single-player

Ghost Town is a text adventure developed by Adventure International and released in 1980. It is part of the Adventure series of games developed by Scott Adams, preceded by Adventureland, Pirate Adventure, and Strange Odyssey.

== Gameplay ==
Ghost Town is a single-player text adventure in which players explore an abandoned Western mining town in search of thirteen hidden treasures. Locations include a saloon, hotel, jail and mine, while encounters involve ghosts, rattlesnakes and other hazards. The game features a day-and-night cycle, with ghosts becoming more active after dark. Players must solve puzzles and manipulate objects to discover new locations and retrieve treasures.

In addition to the conventional scoring system for collecting treasures, the game awards a separate score based on the speed of completion, encouraging players to improve their performance on subsequent playthroughs.

== Development and release ==
Ghost Town was designed by Scott Adams and published by Adventure International as the ninth instalment in his Adventure series. The game was advertised in the July 1980 issue of SoftSide, where it was offered on cassette for $14.95 and listed as requiring 24 KB of memory.

== Reception ==
The game was reviewed briefly in The Dragon #44 by Mark Herro. Herro said that this was the toughest game he'd seen so far in the Adventure series. He also commented that "Scott [Adams] has really outdone himself on this one."

In the December 1980 issue of BYTE, Bob Liddil considered Ghost Town one of the most rewarding and entertaining entries in Scott Adams's adventure series. He praised its Western atmosphere, detailed setting and humorous characters, particularly the piano-playing ghost.

In his 1984 book COMPUTE!'s Guide to Adventure Games, Gary McGath praised Ghost Town for its inventive puzzles and humor, particularly its depiction of ghosts that could assist the player. He highlighted the game's day-and-night cycle and its additional scoring system, which rewarded players for completing the adventure more quickly.
