= Votrax =

Defunct speech synthesis company

- Predecessor: Federal Screw Works
- Founded: 1971; Detroit, Michigan
- Fate: Merged with Vysion, Inc. (1992)
- Successors: Vysion, Inc.; Maxxar; Open Solutions, LLC; Fiserv
- Headquarters: Troy, Michigan

Votrax International, Inc. (originally the Vocal division of Federal Screw Works), or just Votrax, was a speech synthesis company located in the Detroit, Michigan area from 1971 to 1996. It began as a division of Federal Screw Works from 1971 to 1973. In 1974, it was given the Votrax name (taken from the name of its first commercial product, the model VS4 "Votrax") and moved to Troy, Michigan and, in 1980, split off of its parent company entirely and became Votrax International, Inc., which produced speech products up until 1984.

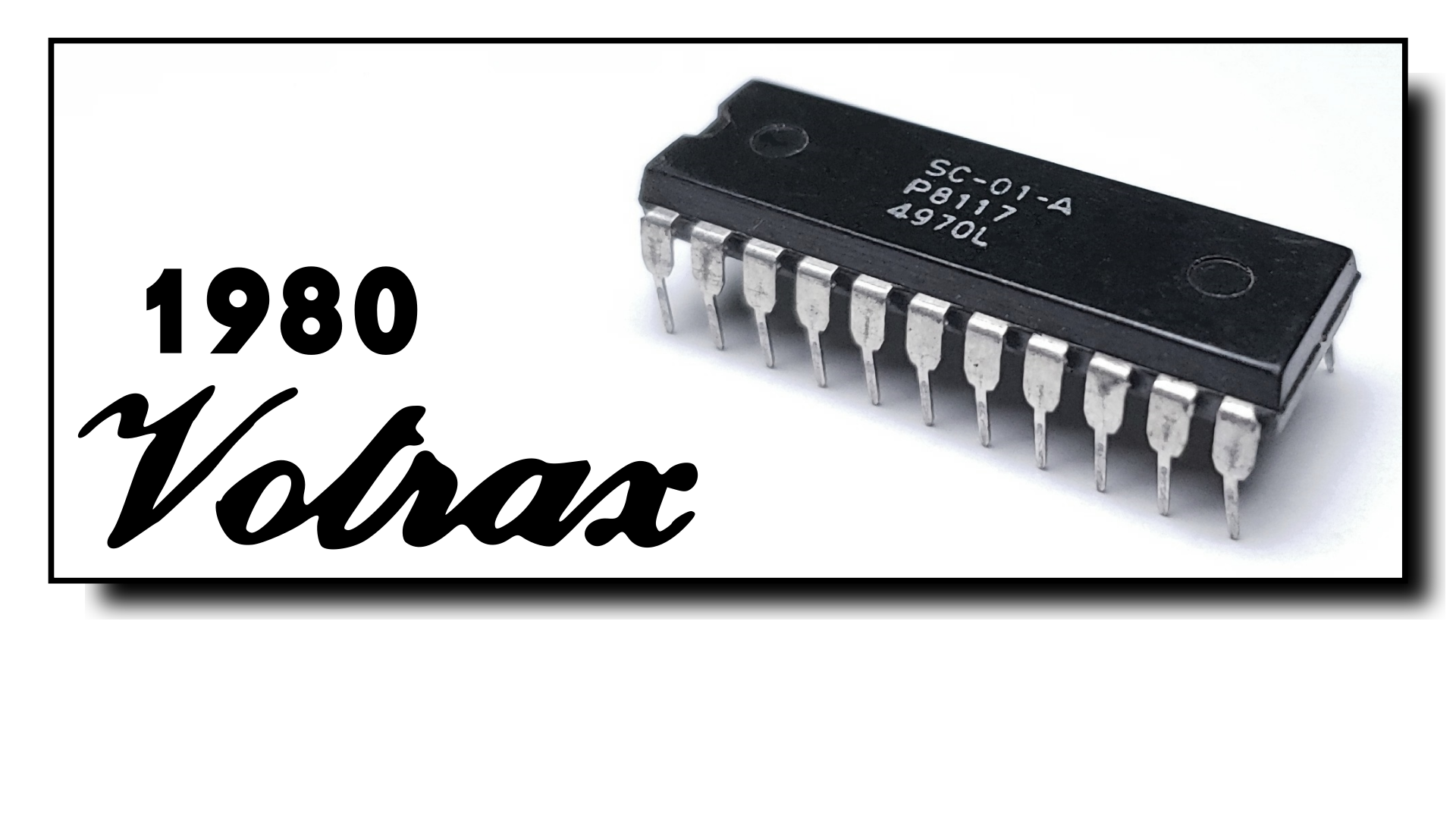
Votrax Voice Synthesizer IC

In 1984, the company restructured itself as a commercial phone/speech audio-response/auto-answering systems company after downsizing some of the staff. In 1987, Votrax merged with Vynet Corp., a voice-recognition prompt pioneer. It remained Votrax inc. until about 1992, when it was renamed to or otherwise merged with Vysion, Inc., a maker of security cameras and other related devices. It remained 'Vysion Inc.' until the company declared bankruptcy in June 1994 following a court battle patent litigation loss against PATCO inc., and from the remains of the old company, restructured itself as 'Maxxar' inc in 1995. Maxxar was acquired by Open Solutions, LLC (then Open Solutions, Inc.), on February 24, 2004, and Open Solutions, LLC was acquired by Fiserv, Inc. on January 14, 2013. Maxxar owned the rights to the Votrax name, but the trademark lapsed on March 11, 2016.

== History ==
All the Votrax speech synthesizers owe their existence to the speech synthesizer design created in 1970 by Richard T. Gagnon. After coming up with a viable design scheme in his basement laboratory, Gagnon licensed it to Federal Screw Works, whom he was working for at the time, and they continued development of his original design. This became the "Vocal division of Federal Screw Works".

In 1984, Votrax either declared bankruptcy or came close to doing so, and restructured itself as a commercial phone-interface provider, and hence produced no new consumer products. The later commercial-only products are not listed on the below list because literature about these seems to have been of limited distribution and has not yet been found. During the restructuring, much of the existing staff was downsized off, including Tim Gargagliano and Kathryn F. Gargagliano, who along with two other former Votrax employees, Art Velthoven and Dale McDaniel, started Artic Technologies in 1984. Tim and Kate had earlier written an article about the SC-01 for BYTE magazine. In 1987, Votrax merged with Vynet Corp and the product lines of both companies were combined.

== Products ==
Votrax Type 'N Talk speech synthesizer (1980)

Votrax was responsible for designing and manufacturing several important early speech synthesizer back-ends, and several widely used integrated circuit phoneme synthesizers. Votrax produced speech backend modules and cards for various personal computers, and worked with the United States Naval Research Laboratory (NRL) to create an extensible speech frontend system. Votrax's speech technology was also used by 3rd parties in several arcade games, Gottlieb System 80 pinball machines, and talking terminals. A Votrax synthesizer was used as part of the text-to-speech subsystem of the first generation Kurzweil Reading Machine for the Blind.

During the 1970s, Votrax produced a series of discrete speech synthesizers, with epoxy-coated boards to thwart people copying their designs. In 1980, they designed and manufactured an integrated circuit speech synthesizer called the SC-01. This IC proved very popular in the third party market, and was produced until at least 1984.

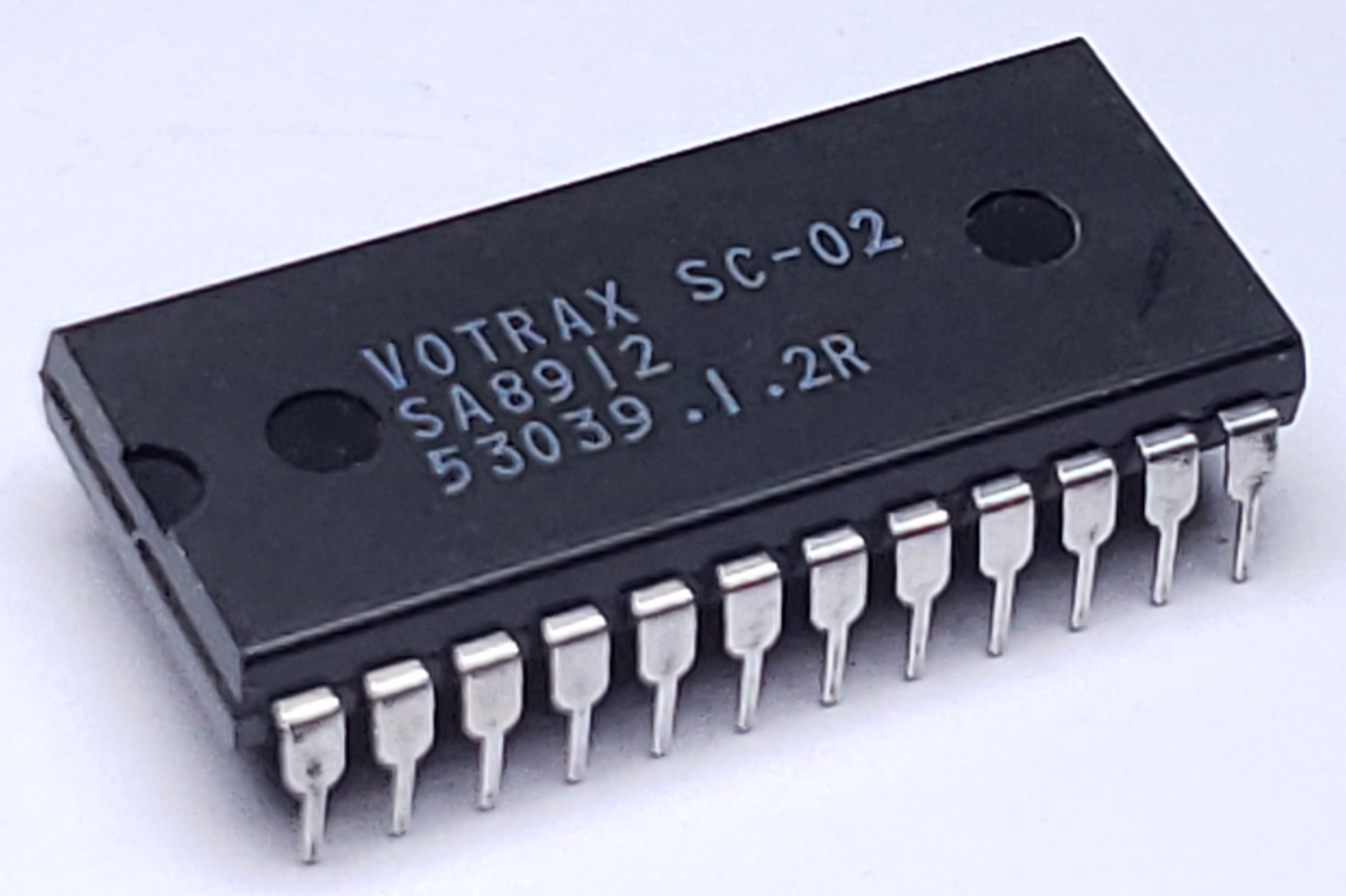

It was succeeded by the somewhat more dynamic SC-02, also known as the SSI-263P. From the beginning of SC-02 production, Silicon Systems Inc. (now part of Texas Instruments) manufactured the SC-02 chip under the product number SSI-263P, and this was apparently later adopted as the official name of the IC. Votrax continued to intermittently sell SC-01-A and SC-02 synthesis chips, and Personal Speech System text to speech units until at least October 1990.

Since early in its life, Votrax specialized in making phoneme-based speech synthesizers and text-to-speech algorithms. The popular United States Naval Research Laboratory, or "NRL" text-to-phoneme algorithm was developed by a collaboration between Votrax and the NRL in 1973. This algorithm and variants of it were used on a number of text-to-speech devices, such as the Votrax Type 'N Talk, the Votrax Personal Speech System, and the General Instruments CTS256A-AL2 text-to-allophone chip. A good rundown of the NRL algorithm can be found under reference.

Votrax also supplied the SC-02 speech chip used in the amateur radio 'DOVE-OSCAR 17' or 'DOVE' Microsatellite.

M. D. McIlroy used a "Votrax" branded "Federal Screw Works" synth, a single potted block, as the 'Screw Works' backend for the Unix 'speak' command on Unix V1/2/3/4 in 1972/1973. Details of the algorithm were later (1974) described in his paper "Synthetic English speech by rule", Bell Telephone Laboratories Computer Science Technical Report #14, which is available on his personal site's publications page.

The most typical commercial products are two boxes named "Type 'N Talk (TNT)" and "Personal Speech System (PSS)".

The TNT consists of a board with Motorola MC6802 microprocessor, a 4K ROM, some 74xx TTL chips, a Motorola 6850 (ACIA) for RS-232 communication, and an SC-01A synth chip.

The PSS has 2K RAM chips and an 8K EPROM which holds "non-critical" data. Inside the epoxy-covered blackbox, there are four 74xx TTL chips, a Zilog Z80 microprocessor, two 8K EPROMs, and the SC-01 synth chip. It communicates via RS-232.

== List of products ==
=== Official ===
1971-1972:

- VS1 (prototype only, Gagnon's personal model)
- VS2 (prototype only, breadboard)
- VS3 (prototype only? a brochure does exist for this but it may have never been released)

1972:

- VS4 (first? model sold by Federal Screw Works, was sold under the product name "Votrax", 3 boards in a stack, 3 formants, passive C/L/C Pi filters, diode "ROM", optional rs232)
- VS5 (4 formants)

1973-1974:

- VS6.0 (active op-amp based filters, card cage with several cards in it, more input options, EPROM-based parameter ROM)

1974-1975:

- VS6.2 (additional digital amplitude controls and possibly pitch controls?)
- VS6.G2

1977?:

- VS6.4

1978

- ML-1 (large rack-mount or standalone unit with a large card cage and several cards inside, four potted boards, 128 phonemes, digital amplitude and pitch controls and a FIFO)
- ML-1ES (ML-1 with added Spanish-specific phonemes)
- ML-2ES

1978-1980:

- VSA
- SVA (first self-contained speech synthesizer, with a 6800 core running the NRL frontend)
- VSC
- VSK (smallish potted module, used on an unmarked rs-232 carrier board, among other places. runs on +-12VDC.)
- VSL (smallish potted module, used on an Ohio Scientific expansion board, Model 567 among other places. runs on +-8VDC; almost identical to and interface compatible with VSK)

1980:

- CDS1 (emulation of SC-01 running on a mainframe)
- VSB
- SC-01 (IC, very similar to VSL except all on one chip. Made as early as 49th week of 1980, and as late as the 8th week of 1981)
- VSM/1 (SC-01 based, has mc6800 running "voxOS")
- Votrax 'circuit cards' (SC-01 based)
- Speech PAC (SC-01 based) (also mentioned at)
- Type 'N Talk

1981:

- SC-01-A (IC, internal ROM change of SC-01, Made as early as the 12th week of 1981, and as late as the 51st week of 1988)
- Type 'N Talk (SC-01-A based later model)

1982:

- Personal Speech System (SC-01-A based)

1983:

- SC-02/SSI-263P (IC, Made as early as 3rd week of 1984, as late as 6th week of 1984)

1984:

- Votalker 1B (IBM PC ISA card, SC-02 based)
- Votalker AP (Apple II card, SC-02 based)
- Votalker C64 (Commodore 64 cartridge, SC-02 based)

1985:

- SSI-263AP (bugfix of SSI-263P, made as early as 21st week of 1985 until as late as 35th week of 1995, was rebadged in various ways, such as 'ARTIC 263')

1987:

- Votalker IB 2000 (Very Small Production Run), 6511 based software ISA card for IBM-PC.

=== Third party ===
1978:

- Phonic Mirror 'HandiVoice' (VSK)

1979:

- Tandy/Radio Shack TRS-80 Voice Synthesizer (slightly stripped down VSL, on a larger circuit board, transition filters are potted)
- Enabling Technologies 'Audibraille' (Simple Microcomputer with 128k mem) (SVA speech core)

1980:

- Colorware's Real Talker voice synthesizer (SC-01) for the TRS-80 Color Computer
- Maryland Computer Services 'Total Talk' (Modified HP-2621 Terminal) (VSB + McIlroy algorithm)
- Automated Functions 'VERT' (VSB + McIlroy algorithm)
- Triformatlon System 'FSST-3' (Modified Zenith Z-19 Terminal) (VSA + NRL algorithm)
- IBM 'Audio Typing unit'
- Midway Wizard of Wor arcade machine (SC-01)

1981:

- Gottlieb pinball machines (SC-01): Black Hole, Devil's Dare, Mars God of War, Volcano
- Microvox/Intex Talker (SC-01-A)
- Alien Group Voice Synthesizer
- Midway Gorf arcade machine (SC-01)

1982:

- Gottlieb Q*bert and Reactor arcade machines (SC-01)
- Gottlieb pinball machines: Rocky, Striker
- Alpha Products 'VS100' (for TRS-80 Model III) (SC-01-A)
- Sweet Micro Systems Mockingboard Speech I and 'Sound/Speech I' (SC-01-A)
- Heathkit HERO 1 (ET-18) Robot Votrax SC-01 speech synthesizer

1983:

- Sweet Micro Systems Mockingboard B & C (SC-02/SSI-263P)
- Gottlieb Q*bert's Quest pinball machine
- Tecmar PC-Mate Speech Master ISA card (SC-01-A + National Semiconductor Digitalker)

1984-96:

- Artic Technologies (several cards using SC-01-A, SC-02 and SSI-263AP, rebadged as "ARTIC 263")

== Support in software ==
Scott Adams, who pioneered text adventures for home computers, implemented support of Votrax speech in VIC-20 porting of some of his adventures, like Adventureland (VIC-1914) and Voodoo Castle (VIC-1918).

== Patents ==
- US Patent 3,836,717 (32 phonemes, 11/12 parameters, VS1/2/3/4/5 w/passive filters)
- US Patent 3,908,085 (64 phonemes, 16 parameters, VS6 w/active filters)
- US Patent 4,128,737 (128 phonemes, 16 parameters, ML-1 series w/digital rate control)
- US Patent 4,130,730 (64 phonemes, 12 parameters, 'low-cost' 1818C and VSK/VSL (and TRS-80 Voice Synthesizer))
- US Patent 4,264,783 (64 phonemes, 12 parameters, VSA/VSB w/digital interpolation and a different vocal tract filter design)
- US Patent 4,301,328 (128 phonemes, continuation of 4,128,737, additional rate control claims)
- US Patent RE30,991 (reissue of 4,130,730 w/2 more claims)
- US Patent 4,532,495 (A speech encoding system, 4-bit DPCM)
- US Patent 4,470,150 (64 phonemes, 12 parameters, unreleased product in 'low-cost' 1818C design w/more random timing/inflection for realism)
- US Patent 4,433,210 (64 phonemes, SC-01 prototype)
- US Patent 4,829,573 (64 phonemes, Software Synthesizer using a different technology coded for an R6511 microprocessor (a Rockwell derivative of the MOS Technology 6502)
- International Patents CA1124865, CA1124866, CA1171179, DE2840596, CH625900
