= Lunar Lander (1979 video game) =

1979 Atari vector arcade game

- Arcade flyer
- Developer: Atari
- Publisher: Atari
- Designers: Wendi Allen; Rich Moore
- Platform: Arcade
- Release: NA: August 1979
- Genres: Space flight simulation Lunar Lander
- Mode: Single-player
- Arcade system: Atari 6502 Vector

Lunar Lander is a 1979 space flight simulation video game developed and published by Atari for arcades. It was the most popular version of the "Lunar Lander" concept to date, surpassing the prior Moonlander (1973) and numerous text-based games; most later iterations of the concept are based on Atari's version.

The player controls a lunar landing module, viewed from the side, and attempts to land safely on the Moon. The player can rotate the module and burn fuel to fire a thruster, attempting to gently land on marked areas. The scenario resets after every successful landing or crash, with new terrain, until no fuel remains. Coins can be inserted at any time to buy more fuel.

Development of the game began with the creation of a vector graphics engine by Atari after the release of the 1978 Cinematronics game Space Wars. Engine co-designer Wendi Allen (credited as Howard Delman) proposed using it to create a Lunar Lander game, a genre which dates to 1969. Allen and Rich Moore developed the game. It was Atari's first vector-based game and the first multiple-perspective video game, changing views to zoom in as the module approached the Moon.

Lunar Lander sold 4,830 units, a moderate success, but was soon overtaken by the November 1979 Asteroids, and 300 Asteroids units were shipped in Lunar Lander-branded cabinets. Lunar Lander was one of the first two games to be registered with the United States Copyright Office, though the prior games in the genre kept the gameplay from being patented. Lunar Lander was included in a 2012 art installation at the Dublin Science Gallery. Since 2000, it has been included in numerous compilation releases of Atari games.

== Gameplay ==
Lunar Lander is a single-player game in the Lunar Lander subgenre in which the player attempts to land a lunar landing module on the Moon. The game is displayed using black and white vector graphics and depicts a side-on view of the terrain and the landing module. At the top of the screen, the player is given information on the module's speed, altitude, and fuel, along with the score and time spent in the game. The terrain is jagged and has only a few flat areas appropriate for landing. The player controls the orientation of the module and fires the thruster to steer the module safely to a landing area. The module is always displayed in the center of the screen, with the terrain scrolling beneath it as it travels horizontally, wrapping the single screen-width of terrain endlessly. When the lander gets close to the surface, the view changes to a close-up view of the lander.

Screenshot of gameplay. The lander is tilted to the right, and two safe landing areas are highlighted.

If the player successfully lands the module, they are awarded points based on how softly the module landed and the difficulty of the landing site and are awarded a small amount of fuel for good landings. The safe landing areas are highlighted with a flashing bonus multiplier, which is higher for smaller areas. If the module crashes—which happens if it is moving too fast, or rotated too far from vertical when it touches the ground, or landed on a not-flat area—then a small number of points is awarded. The player has a limited amount of fuel, which is consumed by controlling the module. Whether the player lands safely or crashes, the game starts another round with a different set of terrain and the player's remaining fuel. The game ends when the module crashes into the ground after running out of fuel.

The game is controlled via two buttons that rotate the module left and right, a large handle that fires the thruster (proportionally to how hard it is pulled), and an "abort" button that rotates the module back to vertical and fires the thruster, burning a large amount of fuel in an attempt to stop the module from crashing. Each action uses fuel, and when the fuel runs out the module no longer responds to the controls. The game features four levels of difficulty which adjust the landing areas and module controls. The highest difficulty causes the module to continue rotating after it is turned until the player counters the rotation, instead of only rotating while the button is pressed. The player can adjust the game's difficulty at any time during play. Unlike other arcade games, Lunar Lander does not feature a time limit; instead, the game starts with a set amount of fuel and inserting additional coins purchases more fuel, allowing indefinite gameplay. The amount of fuel gained per coin, including the initial game-starting coin, is adjustable by the operator to set levels ranging from 450 units to 900 units.

== Development ==
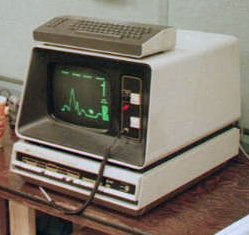
DEC GT40 graphics terminal running Moonlander

The Lunar Lander concept was initially created in 1969 as a text-based game called Lunar, or alternately the Lunar Landing Game. Many further versions of the game were developed over the course of the next decade; by 1979 the style of game was collectively seen as its own subgenre. The first graphical version of the subgenre, Moonlander, was released in 1973 by Digital Equipment Corporation (DEC), which commissioned a real-time, graphical Lunar Lander game to demonstrate the capabilities of its new DEC GT40 graphics terminals.

After the release of the 1977 Cinematronics vector graphics game Space Wars, Atari began work on their own vector graphics engine, in which the graphics are constructed by drawn lines instead of pixels like in the more standard raster graphics engines. The initial hardware design work was done by Cyan Engineering, Atari's research and development subsidiary. Once it built an initial hardware concept, the project was passed on to Atari employee Wendi Allen, (née Howard Delman) who enhanced the prototype engine into one that could be used by game designers. Once it was done, she proposed using the monochrome game engine for a Lunar Lander game. Allen had previously played Moonlander during a tour of NASA and had played one of the text-based Lunar Lander games in college. In Fall 1978 development of the game began, with Allen in charge of the hardware and Rich Moore, who had only been with Atari for a few months and who had also played a Lunar Lander game in college, focusing on the programming. Atari had also produced Star Ship for the Atari VCS in 1977, which contains a version of Lunar Lander, but the gameplay of that title was not used for the arcade game.

Development began with Moore drawing out the game's graphics on graph paper, after which the pair wrote out the game's code on paper for typists to transcribe. Allen and Moore worked closely together, bouncing ideas off each other as Moore proposed programming designs and Allen iterated the hardware design. One point of contention in the development process was the difficulty of the game; Allen initially wanted the module to move as realistically as possible, but they determined that the result was almost impossible to play. As Allen noted in an interview in 2010, "even the real lunar landers had computer assist!" Eventually, they settled on including four difficulty levels, as compared to Moonlander's three, though Allen has referred to the hardest level as "one of the most painful difficulty spikes in gaming".

Allen chose the large handle used to control the thruster: Atari initially planned to use a standard joystick, but she wanted a control with more physicality, including adding a rubber pad at the bottom to give players the impression that they could pull harder for a little more thrust. The thrust control has ten levels of thrust, as compared to the single on or off level of thrust in previous Lunar Landers, though Moore has noted that this gives players more incorrect options to choose from. The game's font was designed by Ed Logg and used for several other Atari vector graphics games. Several planned ideas had to be cut from the game during development. Allen has stated that chief among these was retaining a crater where the player's previous spaceships had crashed; it was cut as the new hardware could not draw enough lines fast enough to handle the detail. She also wanted to add in a McDonald's location easter egg, as was present in Moonlander. Over a year after development started, Lunar Lander was released in August 1979, just after the tenth anniversary of the first human Moon landing, though Atari did not link this connection in its marketing of the game.

== Reception and legacy ==
Lunar Lander proved moderately commercially successful, selling 4,830 cabinets. Cash Box noted in September 1979 that the machines were very popular with customers. It was Atari's first vector graphics game and the first multiple-perspective video game with the inclusion of the up-close view of the lander. Atari developed a two-player version of the game, but only two prototypes were ever made and it did not enter production. The two-player version was cancelled as Lunar Lander's popularity was soon overtaken by Atari's Asteroids (November 1979), which used the same vector graphics engine and which had initially been based on Lunar Lander's code. Atari ceased production early on Lunar Lander in favor of shipping Asteroids games in Lunar Lander cabinets; the first 300 Asteroids games were released with Lunar Lander artwork on the side. In 1980, Asteroids and Lunar Lander became the first two games to be registered in the United States Copyright Office, though Jack Burness has claimed that Atari also attempted to patent the game design, which was rejected due to his prior Moonlander.

The Atari Lunar Lander was the most popular version to date of the "Lunar Lander" concept, surpassing the prior Moonlander and text-based games, and most later versions of the concept are implicitly or explicitly based on the Atari version. While Atari did not produce any true sequels or contemporary ports of the 1979 game, in 1980 Adventure International produced a version of the concept under the title Lunar Lander as part of a series of arcade game clones for the TRS-80 and Atari 8-bit computers, which, though featuring differences from the Atari version, was advertised as "an arcade game simulation". At least one other arcade game based on the Lunar Lander concept was developed around the same time, the non-vector graphics game Lunar Rescue (1979) by Taito. in 2012, Lumen Prize-winner Seb Lee-Delisle presented his "Lunar Trails" art installation at the Science Gallery in Dublin, in which a machine draws out the cumulative paths taken by players of a Lunar Lander arcade game. In 2024, Atari announced Lunar Lander Beyond, a multi-platform game release.

=== Re-releases and ports ===
Lunar Lander has been included in several Atari compilation releases for various platforms by the original Atari's successor company:

- Atari: 80 Classic Games in One (2003, personal computer)
- Atari Flashback 2 console (2005)
- Millipede / Super Breakout / Lunar Lander (2005, Game Boy Advance)
- Retro Atari Classics (2005, Nintendo DS)
- Atari Masterpieces (2005, N-Gage)
- Atari Classics Evolved (2007, PlayStation Portable)
- Atari Greatest Hits (2010, Nintendo DS, Android, iOS)
- Atari Arcade (2012, web browsers)
- Atari Vault (2016, Windows, Linux, Mac)
- Atari Flashback Classics Volume 1 (2017, PlayStation 4, Xbox One)
- Atari Flashback Classics (2018, Nintendo Switch, PlayStation 4)
- Atari 50 (2022, Atari VCS, Nintendo Switch, PlayStation 4, PlayStation 5, Windows, Xbox One, Xbox Series X/S); includes both Lunar Lander and Vctr Sctr, a game that combines several Atari games that utilize vector graphics, including Lunar Lander, into one game.

=== Remakes/Reimaginings ===
- Lunar Lander Beyond (2024, Windows, PlayStation 4, PlayStation 5, Xbox One, Xbox Series X/S, Nintendo Switch)

== See also ==
- Golden age of arcade video games

== Sources ==
- Ahl, David (1978). BASIC Computer Games (2nd ed.). Workman Publishing. ISBN 978-0-89480-052-8.
- Eddy, Brian R. (2012). Classic Video Games: The Golden Age 1971–1984. Bloomsbury Publishing. ISBN 978-0-7478-1108-4.
- Farrell, Joyce (2017). Programming Logic and Design, Comprehensive (9th ed.). Cengage Learning. ISBN 978-1-337-51704-1.
- Gardner, Drew (2004). Compton, Shanna (ed.). Gamers: Writers, Artists and Programmers on the Pleasures of Pixels. Soft Skull Press. ISBN 978-1-932360-57-8.
- Hawken, Kieren (2017). The A - Z of Atari 2600 Games: Volume 1. Andrews UK. ISBN 978-1-78538-635-0.
- Hawken, Kieren (2017). The A - Z of Atari 8-bit Games: Volume 1. Andrews UK. ISBN 978-1-78538-692-3.
- Kenney, Mary (2022). Gamer Girls: 25 Women Who Built the Video Game Industry. Running Press Kids. ISBN 978-0-7624-7456-1. OCLC 1267750917.
- Tringham, Neal Roger (2014). Science Fiction Video Games. CRC Press. ISBN 978-1-4822-0388-2.
- Wolf, Mark J. P. (2007). The Video Game Explosion: A History from PONG to PlayStation and Beyond. Greenwood Publishing Group. ISBN 978-0-313-33868-7.
