= Soma Games =

American video game developer

Soma Games, LLC
- Type: Private
- Industry: Video games
- Founded: 2005; 21 years ago
- Founder: Chris Skaggs
- Headquarters: Newberg, Oregon, US
- Key people: Chris Skaggs
- Products: The Lost Legends of Redwall
- Website: somagames.com

Soma Games is an American video game developer based in Newberg, Oregon. Founded in 2005 by Chris Skaggs, Rande Bruhn, and John Bergquist, Soma originally produced mobile games such as G and Windup Robots, and beginning in 2018, licensed games based on the Redwall book series. Soma Games emphasizes its Christian company culture and often describes itself as a Christian video game company that does not make video games specifically about Christianity.

== History ==
Chris Skaggs, a web developer from Newberg, Oregon, stated that he was inspired to found Soma Games after registering to attend the Christian Game Developers Conference in 2005 despite no knowledge of the Christian video game industry sector. Shortly after his registration, the conference coordinator asked prospective attendees if anyone wanted to appear in a televised interview in Boston, which Skaggs accepted.

The two other founding members of Soma Games, Rande Bruhn, and John Bergquist began mentoring and helping Skaggs in 2005 after meeting him at a Christian retreat event called Bootcamp NW. It was during this time that Soma developed the ideas for its first games, GRoG, Dark Glass, and The Race. These ideas were put on hiatus for a time due to external circumstances in Skaggs' life, but in 2008 Skaggs and his colleagues began brainstorming ideas again. In October 2008, John Bergquist began volunteering more actively, helping Skaggs write down ideas and establish Soma as an actual company (though due to financial constraints he was not hired as an official employee until 2011), and Rande Bruhn followed as an official business partner two months later. In December 2008, Soma Games received funding for the first time and began coding its first projects.

=== Arc series ===
As of the beginning of 2009, Soma consisted of four employees (with three additional remote "contractors"). For the first few years following the creation of the company, the members of Soma Games focused on fleshing out their three-game concepts as well as acquiring publicity and funding. During this time, the Soma Games members developed a fourth game concept for a full series called "Arc." The team members decided that the Arc series would consist of three small iPhone games or "episodes" which would act as a prologue for a larger console game also titled Arc. As a way to obtain early funding from fans, Soma released a computer wallpaper featuring concept art from their Dark Glass game that players could buy with the promise that they could later "redeem" this wallpaper for a free copy of Arc when it was released. In March 2009, the company began selling merchandise through CafePress.com.

The first game in the Arc series, G: Into the Rain, was announced on February 11, 2009. It eventually released on April 25, 2009. The app received a variety of reviews upon launch, with reviewers praising its visuals, storyline, art, and voice-acting but also criticizing some technical bugs present in the initial build and the game's tendency to become boring quickly.

On June 17, 2009, Soma revealed plans for the sequel to G, titled F: The Storm Riders, in an interview with the German app review site press HOME. In the same way that the name "G" stood for its main gameplay mechanic of "Gravity," "F" was said to refer to the sequel's main gameplay mechanic of "Force." Screenshots were released to news outlets a couple of months later and the title was revealed to be a 3D game rather than following the 2D approach of its predecessor. Eventually it was also revealed that the third mobile game preceding the series' finale of Arc would be titled "E, referring to the main gameplay concept of "Energy"."

In 2009, the staff of Soma Games were asked to speak at the Christian Game Developers Conference in Portland, Oregon and have been included as recurring speakers nearly every year since. In 2009, G won the "Best iPhone Game" award at the conference.

==== Relationship with Intel ====
In December 2009, Soma partnered with Intel Corporation as one of the initial developers for their upcoming AppUp app store. A Flash port of G was one of the 22 initial games on the AppUp platform. In a series of blog posts, Chris Skaggs conveyed his excitement to be one of the original app developers on an app store that would be pre-installed on certain computers. With the release of their 2.0 update for G in March 2010, Soma ran a contest for players to win a then-unreleased iPad by reaching the highest score in G. G was ported to the BlackBerry PlayBook in April 2011 to be among the device's launch catalog, A Steam port for the game was also considered but ultimately cancelled.

In order to develop the PC port for G, the development of F was put on hold, but was picked up again the next year. Gameplay footage of F was released in October 2010 featuring a 3D space environment running on the Unity engine, and the game was given the subtitle "The Storm Riders." Actress and video game journalist Lisa Foiles was also announced to be working on the game's story as a writer, and Lisa was cited as responsible for adding cutscenes to the game's script. However, despite releasing many pieces of concept art, teasers, and gameplay footage, the release date for F: The Storm Riders was continually pushed back, and the release for the game (as well as its two sequels) was eventually put on an indefinite hiatus.

=== Wind Up Robots and continuing Arc ===
At the same time as development on F was taking place, Soma Games was also reportedly working on another of their initial game ideas, GRoG, which stood for "that Giant Robot Game you have." During development, work on the game evolved into working on a prequel, and on May 31, 2011, this prequel was announced to be released later in the year under the title "Wind Up Robots." Wind Up Robots missed its July launched date and eventually was released on December 14, 2011, for the Intel AppUp, iOS and Amazon Kindle Fire app stores. The game received generally positive reviews, with some sources commenting favorably upon its originality and robot customization features but critiquing its tutorial and imprecise touch control movement. In 2012 Soma participated in the Intel Ultimate Coder: Ultrabook Challenge to use the same assets from Wind Up Robots to make a spinoff game called Wind Up Football in six weeks. Wind Up Football was added as a game mode in an update to the original Wind Up Robots game at first, but was later released to app stores as a standalone game.

Soma Games helped host the 2011 Christian Video Game Developers Conference in their hometown of Newberg, Oregon.

=== Redwall series ===
In 2011, Chris Skaggs and Soma Games entered into talks regarding the development of a video game based on the Redwall series of books. Rights to develop the game were initially granted to Christopher and Alan Miller, who intended to additionally produce a feature film, but by 2013 the game rights were transferred to Soma Games. That same year, the company started a Kickstarter which raised nearly $18,000 to develop the game, and announced it would be entitled "Redwall: The Warrior Reborn". On August 9, Soma released a Minecraft map named Abbeycraft as a "precursor release" to the full adventure game using funds from the Kickstarter. and in September, 2018 the game was released on Steam for Mac and PC under the name The Lost Legends of Redwall: The Scout. During the development of The Scout, the Soma Games company grew from a team of less than five workers to over thirty people. Two sequels to the game, The Scout Act 2 and The Scout Act 3 were released on April 30, 2021 and December 25th, 2021, respectively. A narrative Redwall mobile app was also released in November 2021.

== Company culture ==
The management and staff of Soma Games are vocal Christians, and are very open about their religious affiliation. However, while the company is based on Christian values, they have often clearly expressed that they do not create "Christian video games" which are explicitly based on Christian stories and content. Soma Games have described themselves as being the "C. S. Lewis of video games", taking inspiration from the author by making video games with Christian values and themes, but that are not specifically using Christian stories and tropes. In its early days, Soma had trouble funding the development and distribution of its games. According to the company, they prefer to try to deliver polished content rather than manufacturing its earliest products on a minimal budget, a problem they cited as a point of failure for many startup Christian video game developers.

The company founder, Chris Skaggs, insists that he values artistic beauty and a good story in games over impressive new gameplay. and has stated his opposition to "crunch time".

== Code-Monkeys ==
Soma Games also ran a sister brand called "Code-Monkeys" in which their same employees would perform "work-for-hire" developing games and software that was not their own intellectual property. This was done to provide income in-between the release of their larger projects published under Soma Games. This was also the web development business run by Chris Skaggs before founding Soma Games.

In June 2011, the Soma Games developers released the game Bok Choy Boy for the Intel AppUp platform and iOS under the name of their sister brand, Code-Monkeys. This game was based around the Chinese Bok Choy Boy toy line. In December of the same year, the developers released an app entitled Santa's Giftship, based on the popular iOS game Zombie Gunship.

== Games ==
=== As Soma Games ===
Year	Title	Platform(s)	Notes
2009	G: Into the Rain	BlackBerry PlayBook, Intel AppUp, iOS	The first game in the Arc series
2011	Windup Robots	Android, Intel AppUp, iOS	A prequel to the planned game GRoG
2012	Windup Football	Android, iOS, macOS, Microsoft Windows	A spin-off of Windup Robots
2018	The Lost Legends of Redwall: The Scout Act 1	macOS, Microsoft Windows	
2018	The Lost Legends of Redwall: Escape the Gloomer	Amazon Alexa, Android, iOS, macOS, Microsoft Windows	Developed in partnership with Clopas
2021	The Lost Legends of Redwall: The Scout Act 2	macOS, Microsoft Windows	
2021	The Lost Legends of Redwall: The Scout Act 3	macOS, Microsoft Windows	
2021	The Lost Legends of Redwall mobile app	Android, iOS	
2024	The Reluctant Redemption of Verity Lux	Microsoft Windows	

=== As Code-Monkeys ===
Year	Title	Platform(s)	Notes
2010	Lunar Storm	Intel AppUp	
2011	Bok Choy Boy	iOS, Microsoft Windows	Developed for Chinese markets
2011	Santa's Giftship	iOS	
