= Lunar Lander (1980 video game) =

1980 video game

- Publisher: Adventure International
- Platforms: Atari 8-bit, TRS-80
- Release: 1980

Lunar Lander is a 1980 video game published by Adventure International.

== Gameplay ==
Lunar Lander is a game in which the player must land a ship on the Moon, in the style of other Lunar Lander games.

This game was part of a series of arcade game clones for the TRS-80 and Atari 8-bit computers. Though not exactly the same as the Atari, Inc. version of Lunar Lander, it was advertised as "an arcade game simulation".

== Reception ==
Richard McGrath reviewed the game for Computer Gaming World, and stated that "I have no real complaints. Adventure International has a winning program here. It is just as advertised--a quality version of an old standby."
