= Simutek Package One =

1979 video game

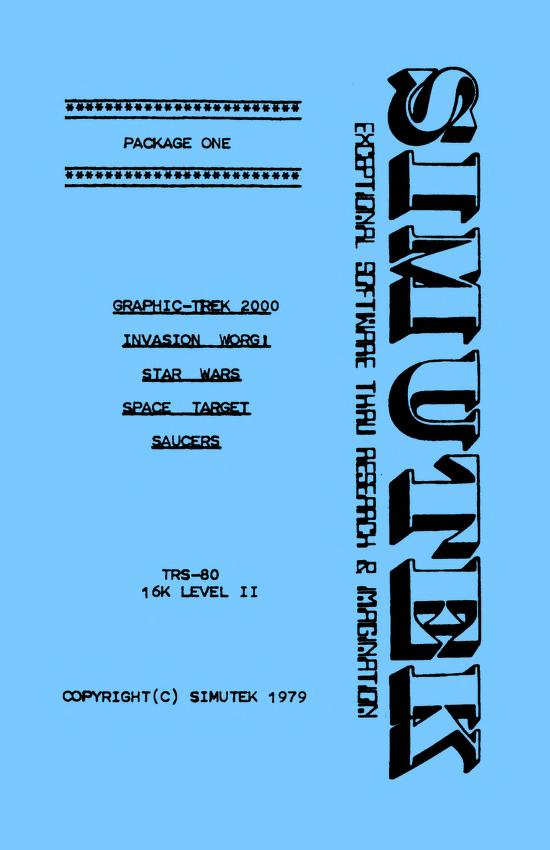
- Instruction manual cover
- Developer(s): Simutek
- Publisher(s): Adventure International
- Series: Simutek Packages
- Platform(s): TRS-80
- Release: 1979

Simutek Package One is a compilation of video games for the TRS-80 developed by Simutek of Tucson, Arizona and published by Adventure International.

== Contents ==
Simutek Package One is a software package consisting of 5 games in space: Graphic-Trek 2000, Star Wars, Space Target, Invasion Worg, and Saucers. The manual credits Graphic-Trek 2000 to Michael A. Gariepy.

== Reception ==
Glenn Mai reviewed Simutek Package One in The Space Gamer No. 36, commenting that "This package is not worth [the price]." R.J. Stehr of Micro-80 concluded that "if you are after a space program package to add to your library, then this one would be very hard to beat and worthy of serious consideration."

== Reviews ==
- Getting to Know Personal Computers
