= Richard Adams (inventor) =

American inventor

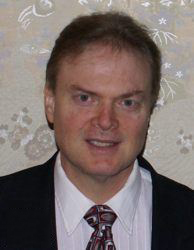
- Adams in 2008
- Born: December 8, 1954 (age 70); Miami Beach, Florida, United States
- Occupation(s): Inventor, engineer
- Spouse: Cathi Adams

Richard Adams (born December 8, 1954) is an independent inventor, engineer, businessman and founder of Happy Computers. Since building and demonstrating a video camera as a child, his work has often garnered media interest.

== TV camera ==
His first project was the construction of a video camera that he started building when he was ten years old and got working at age 12 in 1967. He worked entirely at home without the aid of his school. It originally gained coverage in the Miami Herald when he had enlisted the newspaper's help to find a TV station that would help him tune the camera.

Although he did not invent, the fact that a child could build one cheaply drove home a point that made others desirous of this technology. It continued to be publicized by the Herald and other newspapers each time the camera made a public appearance.

== Music ==
In 1974, whilst attending Florida Institute of Technology, Adams created an interface and software to connect an electronic organ to a computer so he could record and play back entire musical scores with full polyphony.

== Computer ==
Adams built an early 16 bit computer in his home. His brother, Scott Adams, would use this computer to program his first computer game (while attending Florida Institute of Technology in Melbourne Florida) and later found Adventure International, a company notable for its text adventure games (also known as Interactive Fiction).

== Codec testing ==
Whilst employed in Silicon Valley between 1976 and 1982, Adams gave demonstrations on the testing of codecs and authored a paper on the subject.

== Happy Computers ==
In 1982, Adams founded Happy Computers to market and sell add-in boards that he had invented for Atari computer disk drives. These boards greatly increased the speed at which disks could be read and written to and remained popular for many years.

== More information ==
- Richard Adams' autobiography
