= FSST =

FSST may refer to

- A speech synthesizer distributed by Votrax
- Falling-stage systems tracts in sequence stratigraphy
