= Waxwork =

Waxwork or waxworks may refer to:

- Wax museum, a museum for a collection of wax figures
- Wax sculpture
- Celastrus scandens, a plant in the family Celastraceae
- Waxwork (film), a 1988 comedy/horror film
  - Waxwork II: Lost in Time, a sequel
- Waxworks (film), a 1924 German silent film
- Waxworks (1983 video game), a 1983 computer game for the Commodore 64 by Molimerx
- Waxworks (1992 video game), a 1992 computer game for the Amiga and PC by HorrorSoft
- Waxworks: Some Singles 1977–1982, a compilation by the band XTC
- Waxwork, a Marvel Comics character and member of Technet

== See also ==
- Wax Works, a 1934 animated short featuring Oswald the Lucky Rabbit
