= Perseus & Andromeda (video game) =

1983 video game

Perseus and Andromeda
- Developer: Brian Howarth
- Publisher: Digital Fantasia
- Series: Mysterious Adventures
- Engine: Scott Adams database
- Platforms: ZX Spectrum, Atari 8-bit, Acorn Electron, BBC Micro, Commodore 64, Dragon 32/64, Oric-1
- Release: 1983
- Genre: Interactive fiction
- Mode: Single-player

Perseus & Andromeda is a text adventure released in 1983 by Digital Fantasia on the Mysterious Adventures label. It was available for the ZX Spectrum, Atari 8-bit computers, Acorn Electron, BBC Micro, Commodore 64, Dragon 32/64, and Oric-1.

== Plot ==
Perseus & Andromeda was written by Brian Howarth in Scott Adams database. The story is an adaptation of the Greek myth of Perseus and includes characters and artifacts such as the winged sandals, Pegasus, the harpies and Medusa. The objective is to save Andromeda from the sea-monster Ceto.
