= Questprobe featuring the Human Torch and the Thing =

1985 video game

- Developer: Adventure International
- Publisher: Adventure International
- Writer: Scott Adams
- Series: Questprobe
- Platforms: Acorn Electron, Amstrad CPC, Apple II, Atari 8-bit, BBC Micro, Commodore 64, MS-DOS, ZX Spectrum
- Release: 1985
- Genre: Interactive fiction
- Mode: Single-player

Questprobe featuring the Human Torch and the Thing is 1985 graphic adventure game developed and published by Adventure International for home computers. It is the final entry of Questprobe, an intended series of graphic adventure games that only released three instalments before the developer's bankruptcy.

== Reception ==
John Sweeney for Page 6 said: "It's got some pretty pictures – if you don't mind waiting while they load".

Derek Brewster for Crash wrote: "This third release shows little care for what the British adventure market wants and I think it unlikely that people are that interested in mind-bogglingly difficult games constructed in such an uncaring fashion".

Computer and Video Games gave a positive review of the game.

Your Sinclair wrote that "the game's still sufficiently interesting to keep you trying, as you wonder if the solution lies in battling with Blob, inside the circus tent, or in the hot little hands of the Human Torch himself".

David Williams for Your Computer said that "Questprobe 3 will definitely be a giant hit but my feeling is that the Adams database is a little obscure and the price is [...] too much, but I doubt if that will deter any would-be superhero/ines from buying the game".

Peter Sweasey for ZX Computing wrote that "Questprobe 3 is not a bad game in itself, but when compared with products like Level 9 games, or even some budget titles, it is weak".

Zzap!64 said: "As with all of Scott's games, the location descriptions are extremely brief, though in this case the graphics are of such a high quality that the atmosphere of the game isn't seriously affected by this. Nevertheless this is definitely not a game for text-only fanatics".

Commodore Computing International described the game as "a good adventure, with quite a challenge. Despite being slow, it is well thought out, and two characters having to be controlled, makes a refreshing deviation from the standard adventure route".

Richard Price for Sinclair User wrote: "All told, a fairly inaccessible game opening with a linear set of problems in a closed set of locations. Unless you're smart enough to get through this in one or two goes you may well end up feeling cheated and disappointed".
