= The Count (video game) =

1979 video game

- Developer: Adventure International
- Publisher: Adventure International
- Designer: Scott Adams
- Series: Adventure
- Platforms: Acorn Electron, Apple II, Atari 8-bit, BBC Micro, Commodore 64, Dragon 32/64, PET, TI-99/4A, TRS-80, VIC-20, ZX Spectrum
- Release: 1979
- Genre: Interactive fiction
- Mode: Single-player

The Count is a text adventure written by Scott Adams and published by Adventure International in 1979. The player character has been sent to defeat the vampire Count Dracula by the local Transylvanian villagers, and must obtain and use items from around the vampire's castle in order to defeat him.

== Gameplay ==
The player moves from location to location, picking up any objects found and using them somewhere else to solve puzzles. The interface is text based; commands took the form of verb and noun, e.g. "Climb Tree". Movement from location to location is limited to North, South, East, West, Up, and Down.

The game differs from earlier Scott Adams adventures due to the use of time. Set over three days, certain problems need to be solved on particular days, and events happen at particular times on certain days. The protagonist also has to avoid being attacked on the first two nights to finish the game.

== Development ==
Prior to developing The Count, its developer Scott Adams was the first person to sell text adventure games. His first was a version of Adventure released in 1978. The Count was developed in the late 1970s and was the fifth game in Adams' Adventure series of video games which began with Adventureland (1978). Each of these games took about a month to develop. For The Count, Adams wanted to add new features to the game which included a day and night cycle in the game to have it exist over several days. Adams said that "Dracula is a creature of the night, the player is a creature of the day, so I was going to need multiple days to tell the story." As the game was text adventure, he had little memory for the text in the game and counted on players being familiar with imagery from Dracula and Frankenstein stories and could get too in-depth with text for describing scenarios.

To develop the gameplay Adams envisioned the setting in his mind and what items would populate these areas and how they could be used in a puzzle. Testing these puzzles grew out of playtesting them with friends and family. This involved creating a few rooms and selectable items and watching them play, noting any bugs or how players would try to tackle the problems. Adams never storyboarded a game and said that he often had no idea where the narrative would go.

== Release ==
The Count was released in 1979 for the TRS-80. It was re-released with graphics as part of the SAGA (Scott Adams Grand Adventures) series for the Apple II and Atari 8-bit computers and other systems.

== Reception ==
Bruce Campbell reviewed The Count in The Space Gamer No. 45. Campbell commented that "Unless you are easily frustrated, I highly recommend this program." A review in the 1984 Software Encyclopedia gave the game a seven out of ten rating, noting its single-player and gameplay was excellent and that "failure is a fate likely to turn anyone pale."
