= Rearguard (disambiguation) =

A rearguard is a military detachment protecting the rear of a larger military formation, especially when retreating from a pursuing enemy force. It may also refer to:

- Rear Guard (video game), a computer game released in 1982
- The Rear Guard (poem), by Siegfried Sassoon
