= Lander (video game) =

1999 video game

- North American box art
- Developer: Psygnosis
- Publisher: Psygnosis
- Platform: Windows
- Release: NA: 28 July 1999; EU: 1999
- Genre: Lunar Lander
- Modes: Single-player, multiplayer

Lander is an action shooter game developed in-house at the Manchester office of Psygnosis. It was released for Microsoft Windows in 1999 and published under the Psygnosis label shortly before the Manchester office was closed and the Psygnosis label was fully absorbed into Sony Computer Entertainment. Lander is inspired by the classic game Thrust (and, to a lesser extent, Lunar Lander), and features similar gameplay of controlling a ship with realistic thrust and inertia, but with a new 3D game environment. Critically, the game was badly received by most critics, but had occasional highly positive reviews by those who had found the control system to be rewarding rather than frustrating.

== Gameplay ==
The player takes on the role of a mercenary lander pilot, looking to make his fortune while travelling on the interplanetary cruise ship Drake's Exception while it makes a historical voyage of visiting each planet of the Solar System in turn due to the rare event of all the planets aligning. As the Drake's Exception stops at each planet, the player is able to take on missions tendered by various people and organisations. These missions are delivered to the player via a series of emails. The majority of missions on offer require the player to find the entrance of an underground complex, gain entry and locate a particular object which then must be brought to the surface by the use of the ship's tractor beam. When an object is being towed, its weight and momentum directly affects the handling of the player's ship. Coupled with the various obstacles present in most missions, such as moving machinery, defensive turrets and armed ground vehicles, navigating to safety becomes a lot more difficult especially when the player factors in limited fuel and the inability to drop the cargo at will and re-fuel. There is at least one occasion where this is not true, however, as during the 'Macbeth colony' mission, there is a fuel pod in the latter stage of the level where the cargo can be placed beside it, allowing the player to re-fuel and, more importantly, bring the cargo with them from the beginning of the mission rather than leaving it and then backtracking later on.

On successful completion of the mission, the player is paid and the money can be used to purchase new Landers, parts, ammo and the bare necessities such as fuel and shield recharges. If the player performs well or performs a special action in certain missions, alternate missions are made available. It is not uncommon for players to complete the game multiple times and end up finding new missions. There are a total of 40 missions in the game.

Although Lander has an arcade feel, controlling the ship in three axes proved quite difficult to master, often taking days for some to become confident and competent. The default control system relied upon mouse movement to control tilt and roll, whilst the keyboard controlled the yaw. Lander's input system does have a degree of flexibility, allowing other input devices such as an analogue joystick and even allows for the use of an analogue throttle to control the ship's thrust, allowing for a much finer control of the craft to the point of being able to hover on the spot and fly in straight lines in directions other than up and down.

Due to this unique control system and unlike the earlier games it was inspired by, Lander was never particularly popular outside of a small loyal fan base.

== See also ==
- Lunar Lander (video game series)
- Lunar Lander (arcade game)
- Thrust
- Zarch
