= Slag (video game) =

1980 video game

- Original game cover
- Developer: Stewart Eastman
- Publisher: Adventure International
- Designer: Stewart Eastman
- Platform: TRS-80
- Release: 1980
- Genre: war game
- Mode: multiplayer

Slag (stylized as SLAG) is a strategy-oriented war game written by Stewart Eastman for the TRS-80 and published by Adventure International in 1980.

== Gameplay ==
Slag is a multiplayer war game in which each player controls a nation and must destroy the industry of all other players. According to the game's promotional material, "diplomacy is the major factor; but, strategic end tactical planning and eye and hand coordination are very important".

== Reception ==
J. Mishcon reviewed Slag in The Space Gamer No. 38. Mishcon commented that "All in all a well balanced game with a lot of very nice options, but a game that heavily depends on your hand-eye coordination to shoot down those missiles. Buy it only if you're really into coordination."
