= Questprobe featuring The Hulk =

1984 video game

- Developer: Adventure International
- Publisher: Adventure International
- Designer: Scott Adams
- Programmer: Scott Adams
- Artists: Mark Gruenwald; John Romita Jr.; Kem McNair
- Writers: Scott Adams; John Byrne; Bob Budiansky
- Series: Questprobe
- Platforms: Acorn Electron; Apple II; Atari 8-bit; BBC Micro; Commodore 16; Commodore 64; Dragon 32; MS-DOS; TRS-80; ZX Spectrum
- Release: 6 June 1984
- Genre: Graphic adventure
- Mode: Single-player

Questprobe featuring The Hulk is a 1984 graphic adventure video game developed and published by Adventure International in collaboration with Marvel Comics. It is the first entry in Questprobe, an intended series of graphic adventure games that only released three installments before the developer's bankruptcy. The game's narrative follows the Marvel superhero Hulk and his human alter-ego Bruce Banner (in their first video game appearance), who must explore the mysterious lair of the Chief Examiner. The graphics and story outline were created by Marvel artists and writers. Critical reception was generally positive, with much of the praise going to the visuals. Reactions to the gameplay were mixed, especially upon the game's budget re-release, by which time it was considered dated.

== Gameplay ==
The player typed "bite lip", allowing Bruce Banner to transform into the Hulk (Apple II).

Questprobe featuring The Hulk is a graphic adventure game in which the player controls the Hulk and his human alter ego Bruce Banner. The player can move between locations within the game's environment by entering one of four directions (north, south, east, and west), and can examine objects in search for clues to advance the narrative. The game features a 120-word vocabulary, and the parser can only register commands up to two words in length, generally in a verb/noun format (for example, "open box"). Commands consisting of a single letter may also by entered to expedite gameplay time (for example, "u" or "d" to move up or down). Although lethal scenarios may be encountered, dying merely results in the player being deposited in a limbo-like room, where the player may enter "go down" to descend a flight of stairs and resume gameplay without penalty. The game's graphics can be toggled on or off. The player can save their progress by entering "save game" and assigning the current game to one of four code letters (A, B, C, or D), which can be entered to load the game at a later time.

== Plot ==
Bruce Banner awakens to find himself bound to a chair in a mysterious chamber. He manages to transform into the Hulk and free himself, but gas fills the room and permeates his skin, reverting him back to Banner. He explores his surroundings, which consist of three dome-shaped buildings and a grassy field surrounding them; Banner is able to transform into the Hulk outside of the domes. He happens upon an astral projection of Doctor Strange, who advises remembering Nightmare and encourages him to "look for Scott's next Marvel Adventure at [his] favorite store" before vanishing. In a cavern, the Hulk encounters Ultron, who has trapped Ant-Man in a cage. The Hulk gathers a swarm of army ants from the field, allowing Ant-Man to control them, incapacitate Ultron, and free himself. Throughout his exploration, the Hulk amasses a collection of gems. Upon retrieving all of them, the Hulk is approached by the Chief Examiner, who leaves him with the password "Aria".

== Development and release ==
In 1983, Marvel Comics vice president Joseph Calamari, wishing to introduce the brand to home computers, searched for a licensee for use of the company's characters in a home computer game. He personally approached Adventure International founder and CEO Scott Adams, recognizing him as a leader in the market. Adams had been an avid reader of Marvel since his childhood, and saw potential in the venture. The negotiations for their contract lasted six months, with the final version being signed on December 1, 1983. Marvel granted Adventure International a ten-year license for exclusive use of their characters in adventure games. This was Marvel's first long-term license, as most licenses last only one or two years. It was also Adventure's first time using licensed characters, and Adams would reflect fondly in his collaboration with Marvel, considering them one of the friendliest firms he had worked with.

Adams was given unlimited freedom in creating the Questprobe games, though Marvel would maintain the right of final approval, and some ideas would be rejected due to their similarity to upcoming Marvel storylines. Examples of these were the basic plot of Secret Wars and the concept of an insane Watcher. To aid in Adams's endeavor, Marvel supplied him with a pre-release copy of the Marvel Universe Encyclopedia, a complete compendium of Marvel characters. The series' title was conceived over a couple of nights in which Adams attempted to formulate a title that would indicate the player's involvement in a search. Adams and Marvel writer John Byrne spent an afternoon coordinating a rough overview of the series, and Bob Budiansky would oversee the entire project. Adams also cited Marvel editor-in-chief Jim Shooter as a source of input. The Hulk was selected as the first Questprobe game's star because he was recognizable by both comic fans and general audiences, and Adams felt that the character's two forms – one weak and one superhuman – made him an interesting subject for an adventure game. The title would be the Hulk's first appearance in a video game.

To attract new players, Adams deliberately designed the game on a beginner's level by simplifying the puzzles, leading Adams to admit that "anybody who has played a lot will finish the game in a day". The Hulk's ability to leap great distances was omitted due to technical limitations, with Adams proposing that the absence of this ability could be attributed to the setting's artificial gravity. The graphics were adapted by Kem McNair from artwork created by Mark Gruenwald and John Romita Sr. Between 50 and 70 drawings were created for the game, each ranging from 100 to 4,000 bytes in size. The Chief Examiner's appearance was modeled after Adams, and the passwords he gives in each of the Questprobe games are names of Adams' own children. The game is dedicated to Hulk creator Stan Lee, Adams' wife Alexis, and CompuServe CB Simulator users.

The collaboration between Marvel and Adventure was revealed in February 1984 by Adams at the LET International Trade Show in London. Questprobe featuring The Hulk was initially advertised for release on May 1, 1984, for the Apple II, Atari 8-bit computers, BBC Micro, Commodore 64 and ZX Spectrum but was delayed until June 6 with Acorn Electron, TRS-80 Color Computer, Tandy and Dragon 32 versions added to the platform roster. It was subsequently ported to the Commodore 16 The game was made available in text-only cassette formats and disk formats that include graphics.

The game's release was accompanied by a comic similarly titled Questprobe, with the first issue centering on Durgan the Philosopher, who tricks the Hulk into saving his doomed planet. According to Adventure International U.K. managing director Mike Woodruffe, many wholesalers had no provisions for distributing comics, and so were not able to supply retailers with it. Because of this, Adventure International decided to reduce the size of subsequent issues in order to package the comics along with the games.

The game was intended to be the first entry in a series consisting of twelve or thirteen installments. However, due to the Adventure International's bankruptcy in 1986, the Questprobe series was cancelled after three games. That same year, the Hulk installment was re-released by U.S. Gold under its "Americana" budget line.

== Reception ==
Reception

Review scores
Publication	Score
Crash	8/10
Zzap!64	65%
Computer Gamer	16/20
inCider	3/4
Personal Computer Games	26/40
Run	B

Award
Publication	Award
Crash	Crash Smash

Reception of the original release of Questprobe featuring The Hulk was generally positive, with the visuals receiving particular acclaim. The White Wizard of Personal Computer Games regarded the graphics as excellent, but was also thankful for the option to toggle them off to decrease loading times. Steve Gould of Page 6, deeming the game "the best Graphic Adventure of any kind that I have seen", commended the size and detail of the visuals as well as the elimination of flickering in comparison to past graphic adventure titles. Derek Brewster of Crash praised the graphics for their rich detail (singling out the transformations between Banner and the Hulk) and fast loading times. Noel Williams of Micro Adventurer acknowledged the graphics as attractive, but considered them to fall short of those of other software companies. He appreciated the illustrations' stylistic accuracy to the comics as well as the close-up images of the game's collectible items. However, he was annoyed that the transformation from the Hulk to Banner slowed the gameplay's pacing. John Jermaine, writing for Run, was pleased by the accuracy of the visuals to the comics and admired the artistry of the backgrounds. Brewster and Tony Hetherington of Computer Gamer singled out the transformations between Banner and the Hulk as their favorite images.

The White Wizard, while observing that the game design was primitive, considered it to be "furiously addictive" nonetheless. Gould appreciated the gameplay's "devious moves and hidden dangers" along with the lack of negative consequences for dying. Brewster criticized the repetitive gameplay, which he said was exacerbated by the identical interiors of the domes. Williams regarded the ZX Spectrum version as unfriendly due to its faulty parser, judged the presentation of the screen messages as crude, and was irritated by the game's commercialism, citing the game's tendency to advertise a hint book when "help" is entered. Jermaine liked the concept of gaining and controlling the Hulk's powers, and considered the game to be the best graphic adventure he has played, but was disappointed by the absence of audio. Tom Benford of Commodore Power/Play said "if you're an experienced adventure game aficionado, The Hulk is a must-have. If you're new to this sort of gaming, it will make an excellent entry program into the world of adventure games". Brain J. Murphy of inCider said: "Based on the fun I've had and the fun yet to come, I recommend you take a look at the Hulk episode of Questprobe".

The budget re-release's reception was more mixed. Hetherington acknowledged the high difficulty, but proclaimed The Hulk to be the best Questprobe entry due to the character's simple set of powers. The White Wizard, writing for Zzap!64, remarked that the game's design had become antiquated since its original release, citing its two-word input, limited vocabulary, and illogical puzzles. A reviewer for ZX Computing Monthly lambasted the game's design and programming as poor, and remarked that the visuals have not aged entirely well. The reviewer added that while a few of the puzzles were fun, they were made harder by the aforementioned faults.
