= Brian Howarth =

British video game designer (born 1953)

- Born: 1953 (age 72–73); Blackpool, England
- Occupations: Video game designer, computer programmer

Brian Howarth is a British video game designer and computer programmer. He wrote many interactive fiction computer games in the early 1980s in a series called Mysterious Adventures. He was born in Blackpool in 1953.

After leaving school he worked as a telephone engineer until 1981. Howarth was initially inspired to write computer moderated adventures by the role-playing game Dungeons & Dragons, and the UK television show The Adventure Game. His first adventures were written on the TRS-80, taking his cues from the works of Scott Adams. After becoming frustrated with the BASIC programming language, he learnt machine language to create his first adventure, The Golden Baton, which was published by Molimerx in 1981. Following this success, Molimerx encouraged Howarth to produce two more titles, The Time Machine and Arrow of Death.

In 1982 Howarth finished developing his own interpreter, based on Scott Adams' Adventureland source code published in Byte magazine. This used a database format which would speed up development of new adventures. He ported his games from the original TRS-80 format to the BBC Micro under his own label, Digital Fantasia, as Molimerx were not planning to support other platforms. Digital Fantasia operated a mail order service and software shop, staffed by family and friends.

The Mysterious Adventures titles were later ported to the Acorn Electron, Atari 8-bit, Commodore 16 and, with added graphics, to the Commodore 64 and ZX Spectrum and released by Channel 8 Software and later Paxman Promotions.

Howarth also created games based on the film Gremlins and the TV shows Robin of Sherwood and Super Gran in 1985.

After working on the arcade game Theme Park Mystery and SSI's Heroes of the Lance Howarth relocated to the USA in July 1990 after securing a position with the publisher Cinemaware. The company went out of business in 1991 but Howarth continued working on console titles for a company set up by Cinemaware co-founder Bob Jacobs. More recently Howarth has worked on creating applications for tablets and iPhones.

== Mysterious Adventures ==
These are the games in the Mysterious Adventures series.

- The Golden Baton, 1981, in machine code
- The Time Machine, 1981, in machine code
- Arrow of Death part 1, 1981, in machine code
- Arrow of Death part 2, 1982, in Scott Adams database
- Escape from Pulsar 7, 1982 (with Wherner Barnes), in Scott Adams database
- Circus, 1982 (with Wherner Barnes), in Scott Adams database
- The Feasibility Experiment, 1983 (with Wherner Barnes), in Scott Adams database
- The Wizard of Akyrz, 1983 (with Cliff J. Ogden), in Scott Adams database
- Perseus and Andromeda, 1983, in Scott Adams database
- Ten Little Indians, 1983, (with Wherner Barnes), in Scott Adams database
- Waxworks, 1983, (with Cliff J. Ogden), in Scott Adams database

The Feasibility Experiment was one of Edge magazine's 20 strangest moments in videogaming, calling it a "glorious stream-of-consciousness ramble".
