= The Lost Legends of Redwall =

- Logo for the first episode, "The Scout"
- Developer: Soma Games
- Publisher: Soma Games
- Engine: Unity
- Platforms: Microsoft Windows, macOS, Xbox One, PlayStation 4
- Release: Episode 1: PC/Mac: WW: September 14, 2018; Episode 2: PC/MAC: WW: November 16, 2018; Episode 3: WW: TBA; Episode 4: WW: TBA; Episode 5: WW: TBA; Episode 6: WW: TBA
- Genre: Adventure
- Mode: Single-player

The Lost Legends of Redwall (originally titled Redwall: The Adventure Game, Redwall: The Warrior Reborn, and Epic Tales of Redwall during development) is a series of six episodic indie adventure games for Microsoft Windows, macOS, and Xbox One developed and published by studio Soma Games. They are the first officially licensed video games to be based on the Redwall book series since its introduction in 1986, and began production following a successful Kickstarter campaign for the Minecraft map "AbbeyCraft" in 2013.

Originally titled Redwall: The Adventure Game and later Redwall: The Warrior Reborn for much of its development, the series' working title was changed to Epic Tales of Redwall before arriving at its final branding. The games tell a new story within the Redwall universe set before and during the first book, and features characters and settings from the novel. The initial episode, "The Scout", was made available on Steam Early Access beginning December 18, 2017, with a full release on September 14, 2018. A PlayStation 4 and Xbox One release came in mid-2019 and subsequent episodes for all intended platforms are planned for distribution in the near future.

== Development ==
In 2012, the writing team of brothers Christopher and Alan Miller had acquired the licensing rights to the Redwall book series from the Redwall Abbey Company with the intent of making a feature film. That same year, Christopher launched a website and Facebook page for a video game concept he announced he was working on with the assistance of series illustrator Sean Rubin. Originally titled Redwall: The Adventure Game, the title was intended to be released for Microsoft Windows, macOS, mobile phones, and tablets in Fall 2012. After talks with Miller throughout that year, independent developer Soma Games optioned the video game rights for the franchise in 2013 and the took over primary development of the title, now called Redwall: The Warrior Reborn. Soma Games launched a Kickstarter campaign which ran from April to May of that year to allocate funds for a Redwall-themed Minecraft map called "AbbeyCraft", with all additional funds over the target going toward the adventure game itself. As Soma Games CTO Chris Skaggs remarked, "Developing a Minecraft map and server as the first step of the adventure game allows us to create ways for Redwall fans and the Minecraft community to actively participate and evolve the game in a meaningful and authentic way." The campaign successfully raised $17,618 of the developers' $11,000 goal, reaching the first stretch goal for adding the location of St. Ninian's Church to AbbeyCraft, which was later released on Soma Games' website on August 9, 2013.

Although the game was intended for release in Summer 2014, financial difficulties and "tons of paperwork" meant development proper could not begin until Soma Games secured additional funding. In September 2014, the company's website issued a pitch for interested partners to support the project, and in February 2015 announced that the non-profit organization The McClellan Group had joined them as a backer. Throughout 2015, the company took part in a Praxis Labs business accelerator where they completed all art and pre-production steps on the title and began a "grassroots" marketing campaign. Soma Games announced in July 2017 that the first episode of The Warrior Reborn had been greenlit for Steam Early Access, with the game's preliminary market page added to the site. The Early Access version was originally going to be available on September 29, 2017, but was pushed back to December 18 of that year under its new title, An Epic Tale of Redwall. The title was changed once more in March 2017 to The Lost Legends of Redwall following concerns by Random House and The Redwall Abbey Company that the previous one was too close to the branding "A Tale of Redwall" seen on some Redwall novels. On September 14, 2018, the first episode, "The Scout", was officially released on Steam for Windows and macOS.

Soma Games initially stated that they wanted to make Legends of Redwall a "'progressive adventure' designed for multi-platform deployment" with primary development beginning on Windows and Mac with "tablets as secondary. A console option is a maybe." The title was later released on PlayStation 4 and Xbox One in 2019.

== Episodes ==
No.	Title	Original release date
1	"The Scout"	September 14, 2018 (Note: Official release, PC/Mac: December 18, 2017 (Steam Early Access))
Set six months before the events of the first Redwall novel in the winter before the Summer of the Late Rose, the story concerns one of two mice, Liam or Sophia, the newest members of the Lilygrove Scout Corps: woodland protectors of their quiet village trained in the art of the warrior. During their graduation ceremony, their home is attacked by searats led by the wearat Scumsnout. When the mouse's betrothed is wounded, the player must make their way towards Redwall Abbey to seek help.
2	"Escape the Gloomer"	16 November 2018
Set during the events of Mossflower many seasons before the first novel, Escape the Gloomer is a text-based adventure game where the player must guide an otter named Gillig through the catacombs of Kotir Castle to safety. A collaboration with video game designer Scott Adams.
3	"The Miner"	TBA
Set prior to the events of Redwall and will involve a mole character.
4	"The Archer"	TBA
Set prior to the events of Redwall and will involve a squirrel character.
5	"The Pirate"	TBA
Set during the events of Redwall. It will be a co-op game that will involve the main characters from the three previous episodes and feature an appearance by Cluny the Scourge.
6	TBA	TBA
Set during the events of Redwall. May involve the use of virtual reality in an "escape the room" scenario.
