= Missile Attack =

1980 video game

- Developer: Cornsoft Group
- Publisher: Adventure International
- Programmers: TRS-80; Philip A. Oliver; Apple II; Eric Popejoy
- Platforms: TRS-80, Apple II
- Release: 1980

Missile Attack is a clone of Atari, Inc.'s Missile Command arcade video game. It was developed by Cornsoft Group and published in 1980 by Adventure International for the TRS-80 and Apple II. The TRS-80 version was programmed by Philip Oliver, who later wrote the Pac-Man clone Scarfman.

== Gameplay ==
Missile Attack is a game in which the player commands two Anti-ballistic missile silos that are used to destroy missiles coming down in waves from the top of the screen.

== Reception ==
Glenn Mai reviewed Missile Attack in The Space Gamer No. 54. Mai commented that "Despite its problems, Missile Attack is a very good game. Recommended for any arcade buff."
