= Pyramid of Doom =

1979 video game

- Developer: Adventure International
- Publisher: Adventure International
- Designers: Scott Adams; Alvin Files
- Series: Adventure
- Platforms: Acorn Electron, Apple II, Atari 8-bit, BBC Micro, Dragon 32/64, PET, TI-99/4A, TRS-80, TRS-80 Color Computer, VIC-20
- Release: 1979
- Genre: Interactive fiction

Pyramid of Doom is a text adventure game written by Alvin Files and published by Adventure International in 1979. It is the eighth in the Scott Adams' Adventure series.

== Gameplay ==
Gameplay involves moving from location to location, picking up any objects found there, and using them somewhere else to unlock puzzles. Commands are of the form verb and noun, e.g. "Take Shovel". Movement from location to location is limited to North, South, East, West, Up, and Down.

The object of the game is to enter an Egyptian pyramid and plunder its treasures. The player faces a variety of challenges, such as an angry mummy, a purple worm, and an irate desert nomad.

== Development ==
Alvin Files independently reverse engineered Scott Adams's Adventure engine, wrote a new game, and submitted it to Adams, who then tweaked it for release as part of the Adventure series. Adams stated that Files created 90% of Pyramid of Doom.
