= Stone of Sisyphus (video game) =

1981 video game

- Developer: Chameleon Software
- Publisher: Adventure International
- Platforms: Apple II, Atari 8-bit, TRS-80
- Release: 1981

Stone of Sisyphus is a 1981 video game developed by Chameleon Software for the Apple II, Atari 8-bit computers, and TRS-80, and published by Adventure International.

== Gameplay ==
Stone of Sisyphus is a solo dungeon adventure.

== Reception ==
Russ Williams reviewed Stone of Sisyphus in The Space Gamer No. 49. Williams commented that "I would say this is a good program and a reasonable game, but consider your financial situation before getting it."
