= Lunar Lander (video game genre) =

Moon landing simulation games

- 1979 arcade version of Lunar Lander, with vector graphics
- Genre: Space flight simulation
- Platforms: Minicomputers, personal computers, arcade
- First release: 1969; 57 years ago

Lunar Lander is a genre of video games loosely based on the 1969 landing of the Apollo Lunar Module on the Moon. In Lunar Lander games, players control a spacecraft as it falls toward the surface of the Moon or other astronomical body, using thrusters to slow the ship's descent and control its horizontal motion to reach a safe landing area. Crashing into obstacles, hitting the surface at too high a velocity, or running out of fuel all result in failure. In some games in the genre, the ship's orientation must be adjusted as well as its horizontal and vertical velocities.

The first Lunar Lander game was a text-based game published under many names, including the Lunar Landing Game, written in the FOCAL programming language for the Digital Equipment Corporation (DEC) PDP-8 minicomputer by Jim Storer while a high school student in the fall of 1969. Several other versions were written soon after by other programmers in FOCAL and BASIC. The original Lunar Landing Game was converted to BASIC by David H. Ahl, who included three versions in his 1973 book 101 BASIC Computer Games. By the end of the decade, the type of game was collectively known as a "lunar lander" game.

In 1973, DEC commissioned the creation of a real-time, graphical version of Lunar Lander, which was intended to showcase the capabilities of their new DEC GT40 graphics terminals. The game, written by Jack Burness and named Moonlander, was distributed with DEC computers and displayed at trade shows. In 1979, Atari released a vector graphics arcade video game version of the concept as Lunar Lander. It has a fuel-for-money system allowing the player to purchase more fuel to continue their current game.

Lunar Lander games were a popular concept for home computer systems. Commodore published a version called Jupiter Lander for their VIC-20 in 1981. That same year, Electronic Games wrote that "sometimes it seems as though every company capable of copying a cassette is trying to sell a game on this theme."

== Text games ==
A full game of Rocket, one of the early versions of the game. The player has only spent fuel at the last moment, and as a result, has crashed into the Moon.

The original Lunar Lander game was a 1969 text-based game published under many names, including the Lunar Landing Game. It was originally written in the FOCAL programming language for the Digital Equipment Corporation (DEC) PDP-8 minicomputer by Jim Storer while a student at Lexington High School in the fall of 1969, and uploaded to the system library as Rocket after Christmas break. His computer teacher submitted the game under the name FOCAL Lunar Landing Simulation (APOLLO) to the DEC users' newsletter, which distributed the source code to readers under the name Apollo. Different versions of the game were later submitted by other authors, including Apollo II and Apollo 12. DEC published a book of FOCAL-8 programs in 1970 and included the game as Lunar Module. Other versions of the concept were written soon after: a version called Rocket was written in BASIC by Eric Peters at DEC, and another BASIC version, LEM, was written by William Labaree II, among others.

The text-based games require the player to control a rocket attempting to land on the Moon by entering instructions to the rocket in a turn-based system in response to the textual summary of its current position and velocity relative to the ground. In the original Lunar, players controlled only the amount of vertical thrust to apply, based on their current vertical velocity and remaining fuel, with each round representing ten seconds of travel time. Rocket added a simple text-based graphical display of the distance from the ground in each round, while LEM added horizontal velocity and the ability to apply thrust at an angle. In 1970 and 1971, DEC employee and editor of the newsletter David H. Ahl converted two early mainframe games, Lunar and Hamurabi, from the FOCAL language to BASIC, partially as a demonstration of the language on the DEC PDP-8 minicomputer. Their popularity led him to start printing BASIC games in the DEC newsletter, both his own and reader submissions.

In 1973, Ahl released the book 101 BASIC Computer Games, which contained the source code of computer games written in BASIC. The games included were written by both Ahl and others and included both games original to the language and games ported from other languages such as FOCAL. 101 BASIC Computer Games was a landmark title in computer games programming and was a best-selling title with more than 10,000 copies sold. Its second edition in 1978, titled BASIC Computer Games, was the first million-selling computer book. As such, the BASIC ports of mainframe computer games included in the book were often more long-lived than their original versions or other mainframe computer games. Included in the book were all three versions of Lunar Lander, under the names ROCKET (Storer version), ROCKT1 (Peters version), and ROCKT2 (Labaree version). Ahl and Steve North then converted all three versions to Microsoft BASIC and published them in Creative Computing magazine and the Best of Creative Computing collection in 1976; they were reprinted in the 1978 edition of BASIC Computer Games as Lunar, LEM, and Rocket as the most popular of the existing versions of the game.

The first known use of the name Lunar Lander for a video game of this type was in the 1975 book What to Do After You Hit Return, a collection of BASIC computer games by the People's Computer Company similar to Ahl's book, which included versions named Crash and Lunar Lander. Prior to that, in 1970, the name was used for an electro-mechanical arcade game by Cointronics, in which the player uses a joystick to land a lunar lander model on targets, though it is unclear if the game was inspired by the video games or solely by the actual lunar lander. Another Lunar Lander video game was commercially distributed for some programmable calculators such as in 1975 for the Hewlett-Packard HP-25. With the advent of home computers in 1977, the game concept soon moved to those systems as well, with Moon Lander (1977) for the MK14 computer kit, which displayed the lander's speed, height, and fuel consumption on an eight-character calculator-style display, as an early example. While Ahl did not list a common name for the three similar titles in his book, the style of game was collectively seen as its own subgenre, with InfoWorld referring to LEM in February 1979 as "a lunar lander" and Antic terming the set of text-based games as "Lunar Landers" in 1986.

== Graphical games ==
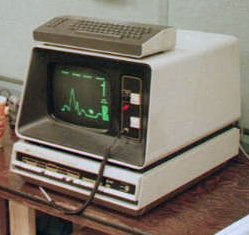
DEC GT40 graphics terminal running Moonlander

In 1973, DEC commissioned the creation of a real-time, graphical version of Lunar Lander, which was intended to showcase the capabilities of their new DEC GT40 graphics terminals, when connected to their PDP-10 or PDP-11 minicomputers. The game was written by Jack Burness, a DEC consultant and former employee, and named Moonlander; it was distributed with DEC computers and displayed at trade shows. Unlike the previous turn-based, textual games, Moonlander is a real-time graphical game. The goal remains to correctly land an Apollo Lunar Module on the surface of the Moon using the game's telemetry data. If the player miscalculates the module's landing, the module will either fly off into space or crash into the Moon's surface. The game is controlled with a light pen, and the output display was a vector graphics system; the light pen allowed adjusting the throttle value and the angle of the lunar lander. Burness completed the game on February 25, 1973, after spending ten days developing it plus one day visiting the Massachusetts Institute of Technology, which had co-designed the actual Apollo Lunar Module. There, he got the actual specifications for the lander, which he used to create the calculations of the fuel consumption for maneuvering the rocket. Burness has said that he does not recall playing the original Lunar, but that by 1973 there were numerous versions of the game which he had played. A few months prior to making the game, he attended the December 6 launch of the Apollo 17 Moon landing mission, which may have inspired the creation of the game.

Moonlander was the first multiple-perspective video game; when the lander gets close to the Moon, the view changes to a close-up view of the surface and lander. If the player successfully lands the spaceship, an astronaut climbs out to stand on the surface—the first depiction of a human in a video game and possibly the first cutscene in a video game. (Note: The Sumerian Game (1966) interspersed gameplay with projected slideshow images along with a voiceover tape, which may also be considered the first cutscene.) Moonlander was also the first video game to include an easter egg; if the player flies their ship horizontally enough in the close-up view, they encounter a McDonald's restaurant which the astronaut will visit upon landing and which the player can destroy by crashing the lander into it. Modified versions of Moonlander were made, with at least one renaming it to a variant of "Lunar Lander" such as RT-11 Lunar Lander, and another removing the McDonald's, as seen in a 1979 Dutch short film Mens en computer (Human and Computer). A port for the iPad was released for free by Paradigm Systems in 2013.

Ad in Electronic Design showing Moonlander on a DEC GT40

In August 1979, Atari, Inc. produced an arcade video game version of the concept as Lunar Lander. It uses monochrome vector graphics and allows the player to rotate the ship right or left and fire thrusters via proportional throttle control system using a joystick with a spring. Like Moonlander, both a graphical display of a repeating mountainous surface as well as a text readout of the ship's speed, altitude, and remaining fuel are displayed. Once a game begins, it only ends when a player runs out of fuel, rather than due to a time limit; players can insert quarters to add fuel to their current game. Bonus points are awarded for landing on difficult parts of the map. The game features four levels of difficulty in controlling the ship. Lunar Lander was Atari's first vector graphics game. The vector engine was inspired by Space Wars (1978) and created by Rick Moncrief and Wendi Allen, (Note: Known then as Howard Delman.) who developed Lunar Lander alongside Rich Moore. The idea for the game came from Allen, who had seen a graphical version of the game, likely Moonlander, a few years prior; Atari employees had also seen Moonlander years prior at the NASA Ames Research Center and attempted to create an arcade version with raster graphics in 1975. Another arcade game based on the Lunar Lander concept from around the same time is Lunar Rescue (1979) by Taito.

Graphical Lunar Lander games have been produced for other systems. Although some were named Lunar Lander, many were not; regardless, the name of the type of game continued to be "lunar landers". Bill Budge developed Tranquility Base for the Apple II in 1980. Commodore published Jupiter Lander, a raster version of the game, in 1981 for the VIC-20 and 1982 for the Commodore 64. IBM released Rocket Lander for the IBM PC in 1982. Ahoy! magazine published a BASIC version of the game for the Commodore 64 in April 1984. Tom Hudson wrote Retrofire, a more elaborate version of the lander concept for Atari 8-bit computers in 1983; it uses a 3D isometric view, so there are three velocities to control (along the X, Y, and Z axes). Other games include Apollo 11 (1983) for the ZX Spectrum, Marslander (1983) for the Acorn Electron and BBC Micro, and versions of Lunar Lander for the Commodore PET and TRS-80.

Lunar Rescue (1988) for the Macintosh combines Lunar Lander gameplay with an economic model and trade simulation. George Moromisato developed Lander for Windows 3.1x in 1990, Nintendo released a version of Lunar Lander for the Game Boy that same year, and Psygnosis released a 3D, commercial version for Microsoft Windows in 1999 titled Lander. Modern versions and remakes have been made for computers, consoles such as the Wii U, iOS, Android, mobile phones, and browsers.

== Reception ==
In the 1978 edition of BASIC Computer Games, David Ahl described the text-based version of Lunar Lander as "by far and away the single most popular computer game" of the time. Moonlander was similarly popular among users of DEC graphics terminals. The Lunar Lander arcade game proved popular and commercially successful, selling approximately 4,700 cabinets. Atari's Asteroids (1979) became so much more popular, however, that 300 Asteroids games were released in Lunar Lander cabinets.

Computer Gaming World described Lunar Lander in 1982 as one of the first fun programs entry level programmers start with and continually improve upon as they improve their skills. By 1973, there were numerous versions of the text-based game, and so many versions of the graphical game existed by 1981 that Electronic Games, in a review of a version by Scott Adams for Atari 8-bit computers and the TRS-80, claimed it was "yet another entry in a field as crowded as the category of Space Invaders imitators. Sometimes it seems as though every company capable of copying a cassette is trying to sell a game on this theme." Moon Lander for the MK14 was one of the first three commercial games in Britain for home computers. At least one metagame exists; Antic in March 1986 published Lunar Lander Construction Set for Atari 8-bit, in which the player constructs a custom graphical Lunar Lander. In Science Fiction Video Games (2014), while discussing the games' lack of science fiction concepts like aliens or unrealistic physics, Neal Roger Tringham described the series as "one of the few video games to be based on a real space program, as opposed to the many games inspired by fictional forms of space exploration".

== See also ==
- Gravitar (1982), an arcade game from Atari based on similar concepts
- Space Taxi (1984), a more fanciful spin on thrust-controlled landings

== Sources ==
- Ahl, David, ed. (1976). The Best of Creative Computing. Vol. 1. Creative Computing Press. ISBN 978-0-916688-01-1.
- Ahl, David (1978). BASIC Computer Games (2nd ed.). Workman Publishing. ISBN 978-0-89480-052-8.
- Gardner, Drew (2004). Compton, Shanna (ed.). Gamers: Writers, Artists and Programmers on the Pleasures of Pixels. Soft Skull Press. ISBN 978-1-932360-57-8.
- Levene, Rebecca; Anderson, Magnus (2012). Grand Thieves & Tomb Raiders: How British Video Games Conquered the World. Aurum Press. ISBN 978-1-78131-107-3.
- People's Computer Company (1975). What to Do After You Hit Return: or, P.C.C.'s First Book of Computer Games. Nowels Publications.
- Tringham, Neal Roger (2014). Science Fiction Video Games. CRC Press. ISBN 978-1-4822-0388-2.
- Wolf, Mark J. P. (2007). The Video Game Explosion: A History from PONG to PlayStation and Beyond. Greenwood Publishing Group. ISBN 978-0-313-33868-7.
