= Project Omega =

1980 video game

- Developer: Robert Nicholas
- Publisher: Adventure International
- Platform: TRS-80
- Release: 1980

Project Omega is a 1980 video game published by Adventure International for the TRS-80.

== Contents ==
Project Omega is a game in which the player manages a space colony.

== Reception ==
Jon Mishcon reviewed Project Omega in The Space Gamer No. 42. Mishcon commented that "A first rate game. I highly recommend it."
