= Questprobe =

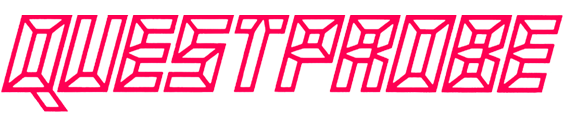
- Series logo
- Genres: Graphic adventure Interactive Fiction
- Developer: Adventure International
- Publisher: Adventure International
- Creator: Scott Adams
- Platforms: Acorn Electron, Apple II, Atari 8-bit, Commodore 64, DOS, TRS-80 Color Computer, ZX Spectrum
- Original release: 1984-1985
- First release: Questprobe featuring The Hulk; 6 June 1984
- Latest release: Questprobe featuring the Human Torch and the Thing; 1985

Questprobe is a trilogy of graphic adventure video games featuring Marvel Comics characters. The three games are Questprobe featuring The Hulk, Questprobe featuring Spider-Man and Questprobe featuring the Human Torch and the Thing.

== History ==
In 1983, Marvel Comics searched for a licensee for use of its characters in a home computer game, and approached Adventure International; its founder and CEO Scott Adams was interested in the venture as an avid reader of Marvel since his childhood, and the two parties agreed to a contract on December 1, 1983. Marvel's ten-year license for Adventure's use of its characters was Marvel's first long-term license, as well as Adventure's first use of licensed characters. Adams, given unlimited freedom in creating the games, spent an afternoon coordinating a rough overview of the series with Marvel writer John Byrne, and Bob Budiansky would oversee the entire project. The series title came from Adams's attempt to formulate a title that would indicate the player's involvement in a search. The Hulk was selected as the star of the first installment because of his widespread recognition among general audiences, and the game would be the Hulk's first appearance within the medium. Questprobe featuring The Hulk was initially advertised for release on May 1st, 1984, for the Apple II, Atari 8-bit computers, BBC Micro, Commodore 64 and ZX Spectrum, but was delayed until June 6th with Acorn Electron, Dragon 32 and TRS-80 Color Computer versions added to the platform roster. It was also ported to the Commodore 16 and DOS.

The game's release was accompanied by a comic similarly titled Questprobe, with the first issue centering on the Hulk being tricked into saving a doomed planet. Because wholesalers had no provisions for distributing comics, Adventure International decided to reduce the size of subsequent issues in order to package the comics along with the games.

The company initially announced that it planned to release 12 games for the series. Adams later disclosed plans to release a new game every three to five months, with a projected total of twelve or thirteen games. Subsequent games involving Human Torch and Captain America were planned at the time, as were potential games showcasing Iron Man and a villain character.

The second title, Questprobe featuring Spider-Man, was launched at the Personal Computer World show in London in September 1984 although the game was still in its testing stage where it was revealed that the company were moving from the TRS-80 to the IBM PC for development because of the size of the new full-sentence interpreter.

== Cancelled X-Men game ==
The fourth title in the series was to include the X-Men. This game was partly coded by Scott Adams but never saw the light of day as a published game, as Adventure International became bankrupt during its development in 1986.

== Comic book tie-ins ==
A Questprobe comic book tie-in was also released. Originally intended as a 12-issue miniseries, this series was canceled after issue #3 (November 1985) due to Adventure International's bankruptcy. The story intended for issue #4, featuring the X-Men, was published in Marvel Fanfare #33 (July 1987). The events of the Questprobe comic book were later followed up on in the Quasar series. The Chief Examiner from the game and comics received an entry in the Official Handbook of the Marvel Universe Deluxe Edition #2 (January 1986).
