= Zossed in Space =

1981 video game

- Publisher: Adventure International
- Designer: Jyym Pearson
- Platform: TRS-80
- Release: 1981
- Genre: Action
- Mode: Single-player

Zossed in Space is an action video game written by Jyym Pearson for the TRS-80 and published by Adventure International in 1981.

== Gameplay ==
In Zossed in Space the player collects trading units and eliminates enemy ships in many sectors of space.

== Reception ==
John L. Vogel reviewed the game for Computer Gaming World, and stated that "This is the kind of game you can introduce to a visitor with only a couple of minutes instruction, as well as play yourself on a continuing basis. If you find yourself stuffing too many quarters into arcade machines, this is a fairly good alternative."
