= Strange Odyssey =

1979 video game

- Developer: Adventure International
- Publisher: Adventure International
- Designers: Scott Adams; Neil Broome
- Series: Adventure
- Platforms: Apple II, Atari 8-bit, PET, VIC-20, Commodore 64, Commodore 16, Plus/4 TRS-80, TI-99/4A, BBC Micro, Acorn Electron, Dragon 32/64, Exidy Sorcerer
- Release: 1979
- Genre: Interactive fiction
- Mode: Single-player

Strange Odyssey is a text adventure game written by Scott Adams and Neil Broome.

== Description ==
Published by Adventure International, this text-based adventure game was one of many from Scott Adams.

Gameplay involved moving from location to location, picking up any objects found there, and using them somewhere else to unlock puzzles. Commands took the form of verb and noun, e.g. "Take Shovel". Movement from location to location was limited to North, South, East, West, Up, and Down.

The game begins with the player stranded on a tiny asteroid in a damaged spaceship. The player must use an alien teleportation device to travel to distant worlds, collect treasure, and find the materials to repair the spacecraft.

== Reception ==
Kilobaud Microcomputing stated that Strange Odyssey was inferior in quality to Adventureland despite being released later, stating that the older game had "many more treasures and situations to figure out" and criticizing Strange Odyssey's lack of help for novice players. The game was reviewed in issue #42 of The Dragon magazine. The reviewer, Mark Herro, stated that "My present situation in this game is opposite that of Pirate Adventure. I've found treasures but I don't know where to take them! ... The game starts in the control room of a disabled spaceship. It took me a good half hour just to find my way out of the spaceship! To compound problems, a space suit must be worn when outside the spaceship. When the air is gone, that's it, my friend."
