= Bug Off! =

1982 video game

- Publishers: Adventure International; QuelleSoft
- Designer: Sparky Starks
- Platform: Atari 8-bit
- Release: 1982: Adventure International; 1984: QuelleSoft
- Genre: Fixed shooter
- Mode: Single-player

Bug Off! is a single screen fixed shooter for Atari 8-bit computers written by Sparky Starks and published by Adventure International in 1982. QuelleSoft released the game in Germany as Kampf dem Ungeziefer ("Fight the Bugs") in 1984.

== Gameplay ==
The object of Bug Off! is to control a variety of bugs that swarm out of a Florida sinkhole and endanger the player's garden.

A game in progress. The DDT sprayer is in the lower left, pointing upward.

The player controls a chemical sprayer, which can be moved along the four outer edges of the gameplay window. The sprayer always points toward the opposite edge and sprays DDT bursts which reach halfway across the screen. A garden resides in the center. Only the wasps and spiders are dangerous to the player. They eat all the player's DDT supplies and thus end the game. The player tries to hold out until nightfall, when the butterflies appear, which reward the player bonus points for every corner that has remained free and also the army will drop in a new supply of the DDT.

When the player is hit, he will lose his current can of DDT from his sprayer, and a second can will be thrown to the center of the garden, destroying all bugs on the map. When all lives are lost, it's game over.

== Reception ==
The Addison-Wesley Book of Atari Software 1984 concluded: "The sound and graphics are poor in Bug Off!; then again, it isn't the type of game that needed better graphics. Game play is instinctively reflex rather than strategy oriented. It is a lightening fast repetitive game, but that doesn't mean it leaves you with a feeling of accomplishment". Overall Bug Off! received a D+ review.
