= Intel AppUp =

Digital store

Intel AppUp Center
- Developer: Intel
- Initial release: January 7, 2010; 16 years ago
- Operating system: Windows XP, Windows 7, Windows 8
- Type: Digital distribution, Software update
- Website: www.appup.com

The Intel AppUp center was a digital storefront for existing and new PC software, apps, content and entertainment, developed by Intel for Windows-based Ultrabook devices, netbooks, laptops, and personal computers. Peter Biddle, Intel AppUp's marketplace visionary, called Intel AppUp "the world's largest app store that nobody's ever heard of." Intel AppUp had a presence in more than 60 countries with the ability to conduct transactions in more than 45 countries in 5 languages.

Users were able to browse a catalog of applications for download and purchase. Applications were available in various categories including books, business, education, entertainment, finance, games, lifestyle, music, maps & navigation, news, photo, productivity, reference, shopping, social networking, sports, travel, utilities and weather. The Intel AppUp center was available in English, French, German, Italian and Spanish.

Applications were submitted through the Intel AppUp developer program.

== History ==
Intel first launched its Intel AppUp center as a beta version in January 2010 at the Consumer Electronics Show CES. At CES, Intel Chief Executive Officer Paul Otellini stated that while the initial focus of the Intel AppUp center would be netbooks, he expected the store to eventually also appear on PCs, handheld devices, smartphones, TVs, and other devices. On 14 September 2010, Intel announced its Intel AppUp center was out of beta and had gone gold. On January 28, 2014, Intel announced that AppUp would shut down on March 11, 2014.

== Supported operating systems ==
Intel AppUp supported the Windows 8, Windows 7 and Windows XP operating systems., specifically:

- Windows 8 32 & 64 bit
- Windows 7 Home Premium 32 & 64 bit
- Windows 7 Starter 32-bit
- Windows 7 Enterprise 64-bit
- Windows 7 Professional 32-bit and 64 bit
- Windows 7 Ultimate 32 & 64 bit
- Windows XP Home 32-bit SP3 with .NET Framework 3.5 SP1
- Windows XP Professional 32-bit with .NET Framework 3.5 SP1

== Intel AppUp developer program ==
The Intel AppUp developer program was a developer program to assist software developers in writing and distributing applications for the Intel AppUp center and other affiliate app stores. The program provided an optional SDKs containing APIs for multiple device digital rights management, crash reporting, instrumentation and in-app purchase capabilities. The focus of the program was Ultrabook devices, netbooks and PCs, eventually expanding to include tablets, smartphones, consumer electronics and other devices. The program supported C, C++, Java, and .NET Framework apps. According to Björn Taubert, Marketing Manager for the Intel AppUp developer program, the program gave "experienced and ambitious app developers a central channel" to distribute their applications "for a variety of devices at up to 70 percent revenue share".

Developers could submit apps from the following countries: Argentina, Australia, Austria, Belgium, Brazil, Bulgaria, Canada, Chile, Colombia, Costa Rica, Cyprus, Czech Republic, Denmark, Ecuador, Egypt, Estonia, Finland, France, Germany, Greece, Hong Kong, Hungary, India, Indonesia, Ireland, Israel, Italy, Japan, Latvia, Lithuania, Luxembourg, Malaysia, Malta, Mexico, Netherlands, New Zealand, Norway, People's Republic of China, Philippines, Poland, Portugal, Romania, Russia, Serbia, Singapore, Slovakia, Slovenia, South Africa, South Korea, Spain, Sweden, Switzerland, Taiwan, Thailand, Turkey, Ukraine, United Arab Emirates, United Kingdom, United States, Venezuela, and Vietnam.

The program supported the development of applications for the MeeGo operating system beginning in February 2010 and transitioned to Tizen support late September 2011.

== Closing ==
On January 28, 2014, Intel announced that AppUp would shut down on March 11, 2014. Citing no specific reasons for the closure, they simply stated: "By closing Intel AppUp center, [we] will be able to focus more than ever on developing the next generation of PC innovation." They also announced that:

- Email support for AppUp apps would be available till June 15, 2014.
- The AppUp client application and some apps would continue to function after the store closed, but that many apps would "require communication with the AppUp client" and might not work after May 15, 2014.
- Apps purchased through the AppUp center would no longer receive updates once the store closed, nor would Intel be able to send product keys for keyed apps after March 11.

== See also ==
- List of digital distribution platforms for mobile devices
- Allmyapps
