= The Eliminator (video game) =

- Publisher: Adventure International
- Programmers: TRS-80; Terry Gilman; Wayne Westmoreland; Apple II; John Anderson; Atari 8-bit Steve Coleman
- Platforms: Apple II, Atari 8-bit, TRS-80
- Release: 1981: TRS-80, Apple; 1982: Atari
- Genre: Scrolling shooter
- Mode: Single-player

The Eliminator is a horizontally scrolling shooter written by Terry Gilman and Wayne Westmoreland for the TRS-80 and published by Adventure International in 1981. It was ported to the Atari 8-bit computers and Apple II. The Eliminator is a clone of the Defender arcade video game.

== Gameplay ==
The Eliminator is a game in the player must stop aliens from stealing the ten energizers located on top of the gantry towers placed across the planet surface.

== Reception ==
BYTE in June 1982 said that The Eliminator "will make you want to play just one more game". Praising its graphics and gameplay, the magazine concluded that it "is the best thing to happen to the TRS-80 in a long time". Bruce Campbell reviewed The Eliminator in The Space Gamer No. 59. He commented that "This is simply my favorite TRS-80 arcade game. Normally, I would be hesitant to recommend an arcade game costing [this much], but in this case most buyers will consider their money well spent. An Apple II version is also available, but it appears to be significantly different".
