= Mystery Fun House (video game) =

1979 video game

- Developer: Adventure International
- Publisher: Adventure International
- Designer: Scott Adams
- Series: Adventure
- Platforms: Apple II, Atari 8-bit, PET, TRS-80, VIC-20, TI-99/4A, BBC Micro, Acorn Electron, Dragon 32/64
- Release: 1979
- Genre: Interactive fiction

Mystery Fun House is a text adventure game written by Scott Adams, "Adventure 7" in the series released by Adventure International. The player explores a fun house to locate a set of secret plans, solving puzzles along the way. Mystery Fun House was produced in only one week and was among the most difficult games in the series.

A ZX Spectrum version was planned but never released.

== Gameplay ==
Gameplay involves moving from location to location, picking up any objects found there, and using them somewhere else to unlock puzzles. Commands took the form of verb and noun, e.g. "Take Wrench". Movement from location to location was limited to North, South, East, West, Up and Down.

The player of this game must navigate through a maze and a shooting gallery, charm a mermaid, and turn off a steam calliope that is so loud the player's instructions are misunderstood – a reference to the "Loud Room" in Zork I. In one room is a trampoline that the player can enter, deposit items, and then exit. The player can then carry the trampoline around, regardless of how much it is holding, thus extending one's carrying capacity indefinitely. Violent solutions to puzzles are discouraged by a gameplay feature which sees the player character ejected from the fun house by a bouncer whenever certain commands are typed.

== Reception ==
Electronic Games in 1981 warned against beginners to adventure games playing Mystery Fun House because of the difficulty, but stated that for others it "should provide a rousing good time".

== Legacy ==
Mystery Fun House was among a number of classic Scott Adams adventures made available for free download by non-profit gaming organisation Infinite Frontiers in 2003. It was also included as part of magnussoft's C64 Classix compilation for Windows and Mac CD-ROM.
