= List of Scott Adams Adventure video games =

Adventure is a series of fourteen text adventure and graphic adventure games primarily written by Scott Adams and published by Adventure International. Some of the games were first published by the TRS-80 Software Exchange in 1978-79 before Adventure International was formed.

The games were initially released as purely text adventures. The twelve originals were re-released with graphics as Scott Adams Graphic Adventures (SAGA) beginning in 1982, and the final two games debuted with graphical versions.

- Adventure #0 - Special Sampler (1979) (Adventureland demo)
- Adventure #1 - Adventureland (1978)
- Adventure #2 - Pirate Adventure (1979)
- Adventure #3 - Secret Mission (1979)
- Adventure #4 - Voodoo Castle (1979)
- Adventure #5 - The Count (1979)
- Adventure #6 - Strange Odyssey (1979)
- Adventure #7 - Mystery Fun House (1979)
- Adventure #8 - Pyramid of Doom (1979)
- Adventure #9 - Ghost Town (1980)
- Adventure #10 - Savage Island (1980)
- Adventure #11 - Savage Island Part Two (1981)
- Adventure #12 - Golden Voyage (1981)
- Adventure #13 - Sorcerer of Claymorgue Castle (1984)
- Adventure #14 - Return to Pirate's Isle (1984)
