= Theme Park Mystery =

1990 video game

- C64 box art (US)
- Developer: Joined Up Writing Software
- Publishers: Konami, Image Works
- Platforms: Amiga, Atari ST, MS-DOS
- Release: 1990
- Genre: Adventure
- Mode: Single-player

Theme Park Mystery is an adventure video game developed by Brian Howarth and Taeman Irmak released in 1990, for the Amiga published by Konami. It was also released to the Atari ST and MS-DOS later in 1990. The game features themes and activities surrounding a haunted and gruesome amusement park.

== Gameplay ==
The player is tasked with journeying through four worlds, whilst collecting keys, potions and other ingredients to solve the cause of the players uncles' insanity. The player has recently inherited a new property, a Magic Canyon Theme Park. The park has become abandoned, and infested with enemies from ghouls to apes.

Starting at a Zoltan Wishing Machine, the player continues through four zones of the theme park - Dragonland, Dreamland, Futureland and Yesterdayland. Hidden within these levels are a total of eight boss fight with Demons, each of which require being brought back to the Zoltan machine.

Each of the four worlds has its own gimmick and control scheme. Yesterdayland is the game's hub world, where the player can access the other worlds and the rest of the game via monorail. Dragonland has the game play as side-scrolling platformer, Dreamworld is set inside a dream, on a chess board and Futureland is an on rails shooter; where the player is firing bullets atop a rollercoaster. Aside from Yesterdayland, the remaining worlds can be visited in any order.

== Development ==
A section of platforming from "Dragonland".

Theme Park Mystery was created by British development company Joined Up Writing Software, a group made up of Brian Howarth and Taeman Irmak. The development company would only ever go onto create this one game, with Howarth moving shortly after to the United States. He would continue to work on games working for CinemaWare; USA until the company dissolved the following year. Howarth would spend time working on this game, whilst he was also working for CinemaWare. Irmak created the artwork, whilst Howarth programmed the game.

The game was developed with a historical feel to the Theme Park, with the game's manual documenting the history of some theme park attractions such as bumper cars and fortune-telling; as well as an A to Z of Divination.

== Reception ==
Review Score

Review scores
Publication	Score
The Games Machine	81%
Amiga Computing	73%
Amiga Joker	74%
ACE: Advanced Computer Entertainment	880/1000
CU Amiga	86%

Reviews for the game were generally high, with Computer and Video Games gaming newspaper giving the game 85%; claiming that there was "only one way to sum up Theme Park Mystery - Surreal." and that the game had great graphics, and "equally impressive sound effects". CU Amiga rated the game 86% and praised the game as "highly playable". The Games Machine also rated the game well at 81%, complaining that the "gameplay as a whole is on the tough side".

However, publications such as Amiga Computing were not as pleased with the game, and Amiga Joker had lower reviews of 73% & 74% respectively. Amiga Computing were especially down on the game, saying the graphics were "gob smackingly mediocre", but were also "unusual and interesting".

Allen Greenberg reviewed the game for Computer Gaming World, and stated that "The conclusion this reviewer must reach is that this one really isn't a very exciting piece of entertainment. For now, you-know-who with the mouse ears has nothing to worry about."
