= Tutti Frutti (video game) =

1982 video game

- Publisher(s): Adventure International; QuelleSoft (Germany)
- Designer(s): Alan M. Newman
- Platform(s): Atari 8-bit
- Release: 1982
- Genre(s): Action

Tutti Frutti is an action game written by Alan M. Newman for Atari 8-bit computers and published in 1982 by Adventure International. It was re-released in Germany by QuelleSoft in 1984. The game is programmed in Atari BASIC.

== Gameplay ==
The object of Tutti Frutti is to eat all the fruits within the time limit. The game sets the stage inside a jungle clearing surrounded by trees, where the player is constantly pursued by deadly bugs as he races against the clock to clear a level. Each stage contains different fruits (bananas, grapes, oranges and plums), trees (which merely hinder the player's movement) and special objects (like ice creams worth a lot of points, but eating it angers the bugs). The player starts with 3 lives, when all are lost the game ends.

== Reception ==
The Addison-Wesley Book of Atari Software 1984 gave it an overall rating of "D" and concluded: "In short, the game isn't exciting, is somewhat repetitious, yet offers who like this style of game a challenge on its upper levels."
