= Christian Game Developers Conference =

- Status: Active
- Genre: Video game development
- Country: United States
- Inaugurated: 2002; 24 years ago
- Next event: November 5, 2026; 0 days' time
- Attendance: 100 (2012), 150 (2017)
- Website: cgdc.org

The Christian Game Developers Conference (CGDC) is an annual conference for video game developers who profess the Christian religion. Attendees of the conference gather together to discuss how to improve their games through discussions, keynote speeches, and workshops.

== History ==
The Christian Game Developers Conference was founded in 2002 by computer engineer Tim Emmerich from Corvallis, Oregon, apparently with the goal of providing greater support and experimentation for Christian video games. In its first year, the conference consisted of 30 attendees, with subsequent years seeing attendances of 90 participants, "over 100" participants, and then 100 participants in the years 2003, 2004, and 2005, respectively. In 2011, the conference hosted around 85 individuals and in 2012, the number of attendees once again exceeded 100 people. In 2011, the event was held at George Fox University, and in 2013 it was hosted at Concordia University in Portland, Oregon. In 2025 CGDC partnered with the Christian speculative fiction writer's conference, Realm Makers, to host a joint exposition together titled Realm Makers Expo in Grand Rapids, Michigan. The combined conference hoped to more broadly highlight "Christian storytellers impacting popular culture" and drew roughly 1,100 attendees.

Those attending CGDC consist of members from game studios who are explicitly Christian as well as individual developers from more mainstream, secular studios who themselves personally identify as Christian. Many attendees are motivated by the desire to change the wider perception of Christians and especially the negative stigma associated with Christian video games being poorly made. Developers reportedly use the event as an opportunity to network with other Christians and to find a community of individuals who share their beliefs and experiences.

== Debate over mission ==
According to sources interviewed from within CGDC, there is a recurring debate at the conference regarding how evangelistic Christian games should be, if at all. Attendees seem to be in disagreement over whether their games should be overt in their Christian subject matter or more allegorical with a message they may present.

Aside from the evangelism, the conference communicates its core values in a way that addresses the tension between Christian ministry and selling a product for profit, encouraging developers to operate "well-run business[es]" without falling prey to greed or "market[ing] God like He is a product".

== Leadership ==
- Tim Emmerich - Founder, 2002
- Ralph Bagley - President, 2003
