= DEC GT40 =

Vector graphics terminal

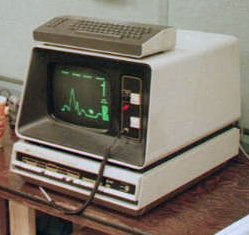
DEC GT40 running Moonlander

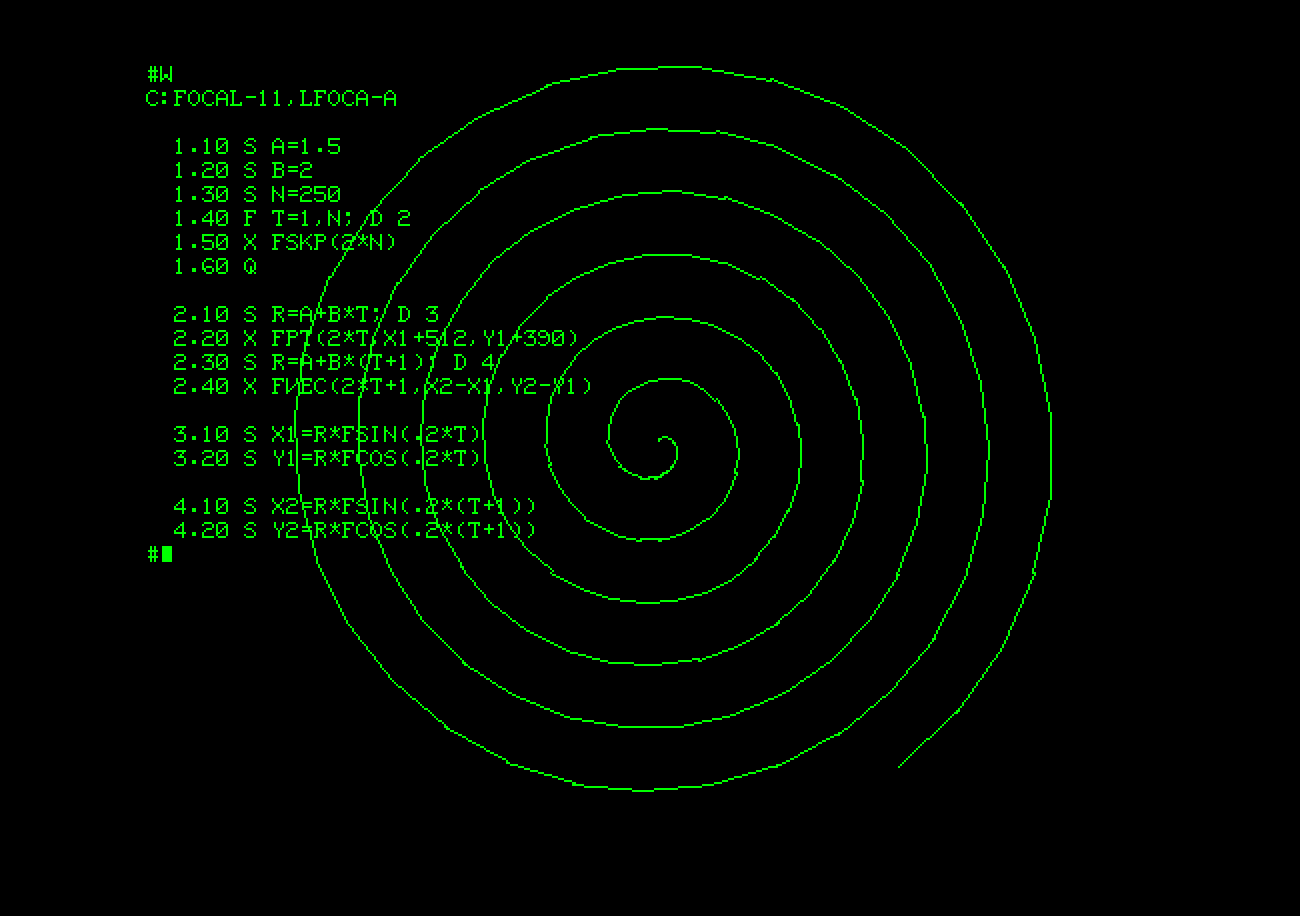
Screenshot of an emulated GT40 with an Archimedean spiral and its FOCAL-11 source code

DEC GT40 is a VT11 vector graphic terminal and general-purpose computer produced by the Digital Equipment Corporation, first introduced in October, 1972 (selling for “under $11,000”).

== Description ==
The DEC GT40 consists of:

- CPU: KD11-B (PDP-11/10)
- VT11 display processor, including bootstrap ROM (same modules as VT11, but instead of the four-slot backplane, this has a nine-slot backplane to include the CPU and memory)
- MM11-L 8K word core memory (MM11-K 4K word core memory on GT40-Bx models)
- DL11-E asynchronous line interface
- LK40 keyboard
- VR14-LC X-Y monitor (or -LD for 230 V)
- 375 light pen

Because the GT40 contained a PDP-11 class computer, the terminal could also serve as a computer in its own right, IEEE Computer wrote:

The GT40 may be used either as a stand-alone graphics system or as a remote terminal interacting with various types of host computers. John Mucci, marketing manager for the DEC graphic-11 group, sees the GT40 being particularly useful in the areas of graphic research, design, engineering, architecture business information systems and many other uses needing a fast, low-cost graphics display.

In a stand-alone configuration, the PDP-11/10 within the terminal can be expanded with additional memory and any PDP-11 family peripheral to build as complex a system as necessary. “In fact, the central processor used in the GT-40 can be any PDP-11 family processor,” says Mucci, ”since the display processor is interfaced via the PDP-11's Unibus.”

== Other models ==
Other versions, using different PDP-11 CPUs and/or video processors:

=== GT42 ===
VT11 vector graphics terminal using a PDP-11/10.

=== GT44 ===
VT11 vector graphics terminal using a PDP-11/40.

=== GT62 ===
VS60 vector graphics workstation using a PDP-11/34a and VT48 graphics processor.

== See also ==
- Lunar Lander (1973 video game)
- Vectrex
- PDP-11
