= Waxworks (1983 video game) =

1983 video game

- Original cover art
- Developer: Brian Howarth
- Publisher: Molimerx
- Series: Mysterious Adventures
- Platforms: Atari 8-bit, Commodore 64, Plus/4, ZX Spectrum, Acorn Electron, BBC Micro, Dragon, Oric
- Release: 1983
- Genre: Interactive fiction
- Mode: Single-player

Waxworks is an interactive fiction game by Brian Howarth and Cliff J. Ogden. It was published by Digital Fantasia in 1983 for the Commodore 64, Plus/4, ZX Spectrum, and BBC Micro. It was the 11th game in the Mysterious Adventures series.

The story is about a waxworks in which the protagonist is trapped. Escaping involves finding statues of famous people (like Hillary and Tenzing).

Whilst some of the statues are exceptionally easy to identify, others are not so simple without acquiring the necessary clues earlier in the game. For example, identifying the British Prime Minister David Lloyd George is exceptionally problematic without first finding a clue to his whereabouts.

== Reception ==
CRASH magazine reviewed Waxworks in the July 1984 issue. The text parser was described as "eccentric" but with "some noteworthy flexibility", being a modified verb/noun form that also allows adverbs and conjunctions ("QUICKLY GET THE LAMP, SWORD, CLOAK AND STAFF", for example). The graphical display was also highlighted, making up for the absence of long room descriptions.

Your Commodore thought the game was not as good as the Zork series and with inferior graphics to rival title The Dallas Quest. Overall it was considered to be "a standard adventure with standard graphics."

Personal Computer Games said the game had good graphics, but they took a while to draw so the option to skip them was useful. They also noticed that the response to commands was "nice and fast." The reviewer thought it likely that the game would become as much of a favourite as the other titles in the series.
