= Rear Guard (video game) =

1981 video game

- Publisher: Adventure International
- Designer: Neil Larimer
- Programmers: Atari 8-bit Neil Larimer; Sparky Starks Color Computer; Jim Hurd TRS-80; Wayne Westmoreland; Terry Gilman
- Platforms: Apple II, Atari 8-bit, TRS-80, TRS-80 Color Computer
- Release: December 1981
- Genre: Scrolling shooter
- Mode: Single-player

Rear Guard is a horizontally scrolling shooter written for Atari 8-bit computers and published in December 1981 by Adventure International. Neil Larimer created the game with assistance from Sparky Starks. It was ported to the Apple II, TRS-80, and TRS-80 Color Computer.

Apple II screenshot

== Reception ==
The game sold 3,400 copies by June 1982, appearing on Computer Gaming World's list of top sellers. David H. Ahl of Creative Computing Video & Arcade Games said in 1983 that "to maintain your sanity, a joystick is necessary" for the Apple version of Rear Guard. He concluded that it was "a fast-moving colorful game that brings Defender home to the Apple".

In March 1983 Rear Guard won Softline's Dog of the Year award "for badness in computer games", Atari division, based on reader submissions. The magazine reported that although the Apple version was "just fine", "According to the ballots, Rear Guard [for the Atari] was bad beyond belief.".
