= Joyce Farrell =

American programming author

Joyce Farrell is the author of many programming books for Course Technology, a part of Cengage Learning. Her books are widely used as textbooks in higher education institutions. She was formerly a professor of computer information systems at Harper College in Palatine, Illinois, US, and earlier taught computer information systems at the University of Wisconsin–Stevens Point and McHenry County College in Crystal Lake, Illinois.

== Partial bibliography ==
- Java Programming, 8th Edition, ISBN 1-285-85691-0.
- Java Programming, 6th Edition, ISBN 1-111-52944-2.
- Java Programming, 5th Edition, ISBN 0-324-59951-X. (found in 315 libraries, counting all editions
  - Java Programming, 4th Edition, ISBN 1-4239-0128-2.
- Object-Oriented Programming Using C++, 4th Edition, ISBN 1-4239-0257-2. (found in 221 libraries, counting all editions
  - Object-Oriented Programming Using C++, 2nd Edition, ISBN 0-619-03361-4.
- Programming Logic and Design, Comprehensive, 10th Edition, ISBN 9798214406763
- Programming Logic and Design, Comprehensive, 9th Edition, ISBN 9781337102070
- Programming Logic and Design, Comprehensive, 8th Edition, ISBN 978-1285776712
- Programming Logic and Design, Comprehensive, 7th Edition, ISBN 978-1-111-96975-2.
- Programming Logic and Design, Comprehensive, 6th Edition, ISBN 978-0-538-74476-8.
- Programming Logic and Design, Comprehensive, 5th Edition, ISBN 1-4239-0196-7. (found in 200 libraries, counting all 8 editions
  - Programming Logic and Design, Introductory, 5th Edition, ISBN 1-4239-0195-9.
  - Programming Logic and Design, Comprehensive, 4th Edition, ISBN 1-4188-3633-8.
  - Programming Logic and Design, Introductory, 4th Edition, ISBN 1-4188-3634-6.
- An Object-Oriented Approach to Programming Logic and Design, 2nd Edition, ISBN 1-4239-0184-3. (found in 59 libraries, counting all editions
- Microsoft Visual C# .NET, 1st Edition, ISBN 0-619-06273-8. (found in 57 libraries, counting all editions
- Microsoft Visual C# 2008: An Introduction to Object-Oriented Programming, 3rd Edition, ISBN 1-4239-0255-6.
  - Microsoft Visual C# 2005, An Introduction to Object-Oriented Programming, 2nd Edition, ISBN 1-4239-0151-7 found in 20 libraries, counting all editions

With Don Gosselin:

- Java programming with Microsoft Visual J++ 6.0: comprehensive, (1998) (found in 77 libraries, counting all editions
