= Allmyapps =

- Developer: Allmyapps
- Release: 16 December 2010; 15 years ago
- Operating system: Microsoft Windows, Linux
- Available in: English, French
- Type: Digital distribution, Software update, Installer
- License: Freemium
- Website: allmyapps.com

Allmyapps was an application store for Microsoft Windows. The service allowed users to install, update and organize over 1,500 PC applications.

== History ==
Allmyapps developed an application manager for Ubuntu before entering Microsoft's IDEEs program and receiving 1 million euro from Elaia Partners in 2010. The company launched the first Windows application store as a beta version at LeWeb in December 2010, for which it won the Startup Pitch competition. In December 2011, Allmyapps announced that they had 2.5 million registered users. On October 21, 2014, Allmyapps was bought by ironSource.

== Features ==
Allmyapps operated on Windows 8, Windows 7, Windows Vista and Windows XP. The service enabled users to find and install applications via its website and desktop client. It automatically detected applications that were already installed in a computer and informed the user if they were available. It also enabled users to store their list of applications in their Allmyapps' account, then use that list to reinstall the applications, such as when moving to a new or reinstalled computer.
