= Voodoo Castle =

1979 video game

- Developer: Adventure International
- Publisher: Adventure International
- Designers: Scott Adams; Alexis Adams
- Series: Adventure
- Platforms: Apple II, Atari 8-bit, PET, TRS-80, VIC-20, TI-99/4A, Commodore 64, Classic Mac OS, ZX Spectrum, BBC Micro, Acorn Electron, Dragon 32/64
- Release: 1979
- Genre: Interactive fiction

Voodoo Castle is a text adventure and is the fourth in the series of adventure games designed by Scott Adams. The game was written by his wife Alexis Adams and was published by Adventure International in 1979. It was available for the VIC-20, the Commodore 64, Apple II, and other contemporary computers.

== Gameplay ==
Gameplay involves moving from location to location, picking up objects along the way, and using them to unlock puzzles. Commands take the form of verbs and nouns, e.g. "Climb Tree". Movement is limited to North, South, East, West, Up, and Down. The player must type in commands to progress.

The goal is to wake up Count Cristo, who is lying in a coffin at the starting location. In order to do so, the player must obtain certain items, which requires overcoming obstacles, such as exploding test tubes and a doorway that is too small to pass through normally. The player must visit all 24 areas of the castle, and use magic on voodoo items.

== Reception ==
Voodoo Castle was described as a challenge and noted as one of Scott Adams's more complex adventure games, requiring around 150 commands to reach the end. New Atari User gave it a 2/3, noting "nice pictures, limited vocabulary, illogical puzzles." Commodore Computing International rated it highly, saying "despite the scarcity of any sort of vivid description, Voodoo Castle manages to keep you clicking right along on that keyboard."
