= Pirate Adventure =

- Publishers: Creative Computing Software; Adventure International
- Designer: Scott Adams
- Series: Adventure
- Platforms: TRS-80, VIC-20, TI-99/4A, Apple II, Atari 8-bit, PET, Commodore 64, ZX Spectrum, BBC Micro, Acorn Electron, Dragon 32/64
- Release: 1979
- Genre: Text adventure

Pirate Adventure (also known as Pirate Cove) is a text adventure video game written by Scott Adams. It was published by Adams' company, Adventure International, in 1979.

== Description ==
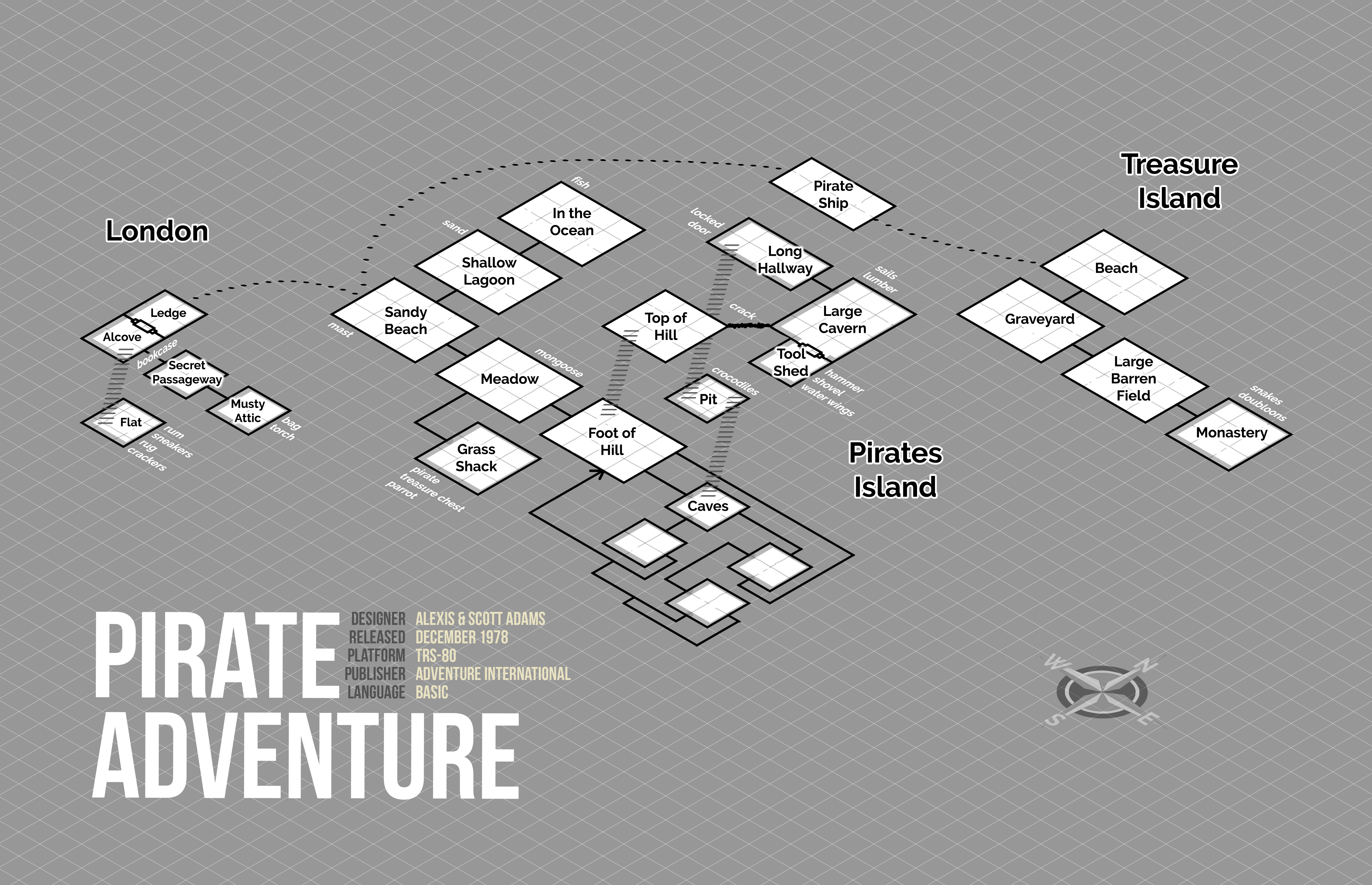
A map of Pirate Adventure world by Aaron A. Reed from 50 Years of Text Games project

Published by Adventure International and the second game of the series, after Adventureland, this text-based adventure game was one of many adventure games created by Scott Adams, in this case based on his wife Alexis's ideas. The setting was inspired by Robert Louis Stevenson's 1883 novel Treasure Island and involved a quest to retrieve Long John Silver's lost treasures.

Gameplay involved moving from location to location, picking up any objects found there, and using them somewhere else to unlock puzzles. Commands took the form of verb and noun, e.g. "Climb Tree".

The player starts the game in a London flat, and progresses via a bit of magic to Pirates Island. Here, the player has to build a ship to reach Treasure Island and there find two pieces of treasure. The player also has to contend with an unpredictable pirate ally; it was the first text adventure game of the Adams series in which the player shared the adventure with a second character.

The magic phrase to reach the island in this game, 'Say Yoho', was the name of a long-running column in SoftSide magazine by Scott Adams.

== Source code ==
The BASIC source code for Pirate Adventure was printed in the December 1980 issue of BYTE, with an addendum in April 1981. This enabled others to discover how the engine worked and to create their own adventures using this or a similar design.

== Reception ==
Pirate Adventure was reviewed in issue #42 of The Dragon magazine. The reviewer, Mark Herro, commented on the difficulty of the game: "Supposedly one of the "easier" programs of the series, I'm embarrassed to say that I have yet to find a treasure in Pirate Adventure... This Program has been sending me in circles for weeks."

Bruce Campbell reviewed Pirate's Cove in The Space Gamer No. 36. Campbell commented that "Pirate's Cove is a good first adventure (some of the others are harder), but also entertaining for the experienced adventurer."
