= Scott Adams (game designer) =

American game designer (born 1952)

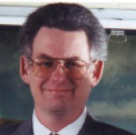
- Adams in 2002
- Born: July 10, 1952 (age 74); Miami, Florida
- Website: www.msadams.com

Scott Adams (born July 10, 1952) is an American entrepreneur, computer programmer, and video game designer. He co-founded, with then-wife Alexis, Adventure International in 1979. The company developed and published video games for home computers. The cornerstone products of Adventure International in its early years were the Adventure series of text adventures written by Adams.

== Adventure International ==
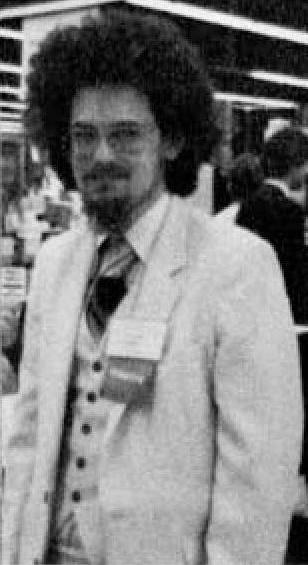
Scott Adams in 1982

Born in Miami, Florida, Adams had access to an advanced 16-bit computer at home, built by his brother Richard Adams, that gave him a jump on game programming in his leisure time. Adams wrote a graphical action game similar to Spacewar! on this system in 1975.

Scott Adams was the first person known to create an adventure-style game for personal computers, in 1978 on a 16 KB Radio Shack TRS-80 Model I, written in BASIC. Colossal Cave was written two years earlier by Will Crowther, but on a mainframe computer (the PDP-10). These early text adventures recognize two-word commands of the form VERB NOUN. The parser only scans the first three letters of each command, so SCREAM BEAR, SCRATCH BEAR, or SCREW BEAR are treated identically. The games from his company, Adventure International, were subsequently released on most of the major home computers of the day, including TRS-80, Exidy Sorcerer, Apple II, Atari 8-bit computers, PET, VIC-20, and ZX Spectrum. Later adventure games added graphics, with the text entry window below an image illustrating the scene.

Adams's work was influential in adventure gaming. In 1990 Computer Gaming World reported a statement by a "respected designer" that it was impossible to design new and more difficult adventure puzzles, because Adams had already created them all in his early games.

Adams and his wife eventually started organizing their own conventions, and opened a chain of computer stores in Orlando. Alexis negotiated the rights to make a video game out of the Buckaroo Banzai sci-fi movie in 1983.

== Later work ==
Since the late 1980s, Scott Adams has worked as a senior programmer for AVISTA in Platteville, Wisconsin.

In 2013, Scott Adams released the Bible-based The Inheritance, his first game in over ten years. As in most of his other games, the player is the protagonist of a novel-like story and helps events unfold in a text adventure set. However, this new game also includes sound. In a 2018 interview Adams said he had not been happy with the game as it was released so had withdrawn it from the market whilst it was rewritten.

In July 2016, Adams created a new company called Clopas to begin publishing games in a new genre he called "Conversational Adventure Games". These games were similar to his early text adventure games, except that they now supported full natural language sentences. The first game he put out under this company was Escape The Gloomer, a game published in collaboration with Soma Games for their Lost Legends of Redwall series.

== Personal life ==
Adams met Irene Alexandra Schlossberg aka Alexis Schlossberg in 1977 and they married not long after. While at first she only saw his computer obsession as something that prevented them from sharing more time together, already when pregnant with the couple's first child Alexis Adams saw the business potential of personal computer adventure games, and they started their company as co-founders. Adams would describe how his wife "handles most of the business" as the corporate vice president and general manager of Adventure International, and that she "has been intimately involved in all aspects... from the very beginning".

The couple decided to build an image of mystery around their company and opted to put Scott's name alone on products. Still Alexis was credited as co-creator on some games' title screens, with one giving her sole billing: Voodoo Castle (1979). In a 1980 interview, Scott credited his wife with using his tools to create 95% of the game by herself. One character from Voodoo Castle, "Medium Maegen" named after the couple's daughter, may be the first woman with dialogue in a video game, appearing years before most other contenders.

Scott and Alexis divorced not long after the video game crash of 1983. Alexis died in 2008, 51 years old.

Adams later remarried.

== Games ==
=== Adventure International ===
- Adventureland (1978)
- Pirate Adventure (also called Pirate Cove) (1979)
- Secret Mission (1979)
- Voodoo Castle (1979) in collaboration with Alexis Adams
- The Count (1979)
- Strange Odyssey (1979)
- Mystery Fun House (1979)
- Pyramid of Doom (1979) in collaboration with Alvin Files
- Ghost Town (1980)
- Savage Island, Part I (1981)
- Savage Island, Part II (1981) in collaboration with Russ Wetmore
- Golden Voyage (1981) in collaboration with William Demas
- Sorcerer of Claymorgue Castle (1982)
- Return to Pirate's Isle (1983) exclusively for the TI-99/4A
- Questprobe #1: The Hulk (1984)
- Questprobe #2: Spider-Man (1984)
- Questprobe #3: The Fantastic Four (1984)
- The Adventures of Buckaroo Banzai Across the 8th Dimension (1984) in collaboration with Phillip Case

=== Later ===
- Scott Adams Scoops (1987) collection of earlier games published by U.S. Gold
- Return to Pirate's Island 2 (August 2000)
- The Inheritance (February 14, 2013)
- The Lost Legends of Redwall: Escape the Gloomer (2018)

=== Unreleased ===
- Questprobe #4: X-Men
