= Adventureland (video game) =

1978 video game

- Publishers: Creative Computing Software; Adventure International
- Designer: Scott Adams
- Series: Adventure
- Platforms: TRS-80, Apple II, Atari 8-bit, TI-99/4A, PET, Commodore 64, IBM PC, VIC-20, ZX Spectrum, BBC Micro, Acorn Electron, Dragon 32/64, Exidy Sorcerer
- Release: 1978
- Genre: Interactive fiction

Adventureland is a text adventure video game for microcomputers, released by Scott Adams in 1978. The game has no plot but simply involves searching for thirteen lost artifacts in a fantasy setting. Its success led Adams to form Adventure International, which went on to publish thirteen similar games in the Adventure series, each in different settings.

== Gameplay ==
Adventureland is controlled through the use of written commands. These can consist of a single word, such as those used for player character movement, including north, south, east, west, up, and down. They can also take the form of simple, two-word verb/noun phrases, such as "climb tree". Although the game can recognize about 120 words, the parser only takes the first three letters into account. This means not only that the parser occasionally misidentifies words, but also that commands can be truncated: "lig lam" would be interpreted as "light lamp".

In order to complete the game, the player has to collect the thirteen lost artifacts: a jeweled fruit, a golden fish, a dragon's egg, a golden net, a magic carpet, a diamond necklace, a diamond bracelet, a pot of rubies, "royal honey", a crown, a magic mirror, a "firestone", and a statue of Paul Bunyan's blue ox Babe.

== Development ==
Adventureland, Adams' first program, was inspired by the earlier Colossal Cave Adventure, though it is not on the same scale. The source code for Adventureland was published in SoftSide magazine in 1980 and the database format was subsequently used in other interpreters such as Brian Howarth's Mysterious Adventures series.

The cover of the graphical version of Adventureland

Adventureland was written for the TRS-80, then ported to other systems, most of which didn't exist in 1978: Apple II, Atari 8-bit computers, TI-99/4A, PET, VIC-20, Commodore 64, IBM PC, ZX Spectrum, BBC Micro, Acorn Electron, Dragon 32/64, and Exidy Sorcerer. A cut-down, three treasure version entitled Adventure 0: Special Sampler was also sold at a lower price.

In 1982, Adventureland was re-released with graphics, thus enabling the player to view visible representations of the scenery and objects.

== Reception ==
Mark Herro for Dragon commented that "I can't recommend ANY version of Scott Adams' Adventure series highly enough. Beg, borrow, or steal a chance to play Adventure!" British print magazine Micro Adventurer praised the VIC-20 version was released as a cartridge as the loading times would be too long otherwise. The screen format and parser were "standard" according to the magazine. It criticized minor controlling features, the non-consistent map and the seemingly random placement of treasures. InfoWorld's Essential Guide to Atari Computers recommended the game as "the best of the early" adventures.
