= Adventure International =

American video game publisher

- Industry: Computer game publishing
- Founded: 1979
- Defunct: 1986
- Fate: Bankrupt
- Headquarters: Longwood, Florida, United States
- Key people: Scott Adams, Alexis Adams
- Products: Adventureland
- Parent: Scott Adams, Inc.
- Subsidiaries: Adventure Soft UK

Adventure International was an American video game publishing company that existed from 1979 until 1986. It was started by Scott and Alexis Adams. Their games were notable for being the first implementation of the adventure genre to run on a microcomputer system. The adventure game concept originally came from Colossal Cave Adventure which ran strictly on large mainframe systems at the time.

== History ==
After the success of Adams' first text adventure, Adventureland, other games followed rapidly, with Adventure International (or "AI") releasing about two games a year. Initially the games were drawn from the founders' imaginations, with themes ranging from fantasy to horror and sometimes science fiction. Some of the later games were written by Scott Adams with other collaborators.

In 1980, five of the company's games were ported to the VIC-20. Developer Neil Harris recalled: "[O]ur sales guys could not figure out what they were gonna do with them. 'What are these games? It's all words on the screen! There's no graphics! What kind of a video game doesn't have video?' [laughs] And they became the best-selling cartridges for the VIC-20, period."

By 1983 the company was employing 40 people and was based in Longwood, Florida.

Fourteen games later, Adventure International began to release games drawn from film and fiction. The Buckaroo Banzai game was based on the film The Adventures of Buckaroo Banzai Across the 8th Dimension (1984). Other games came from Marvel Comics - Adventure International released three Questprobe games based on the Marvel characters The Incredible Hulk, Spider-Man, The Human Torch and the Thing.

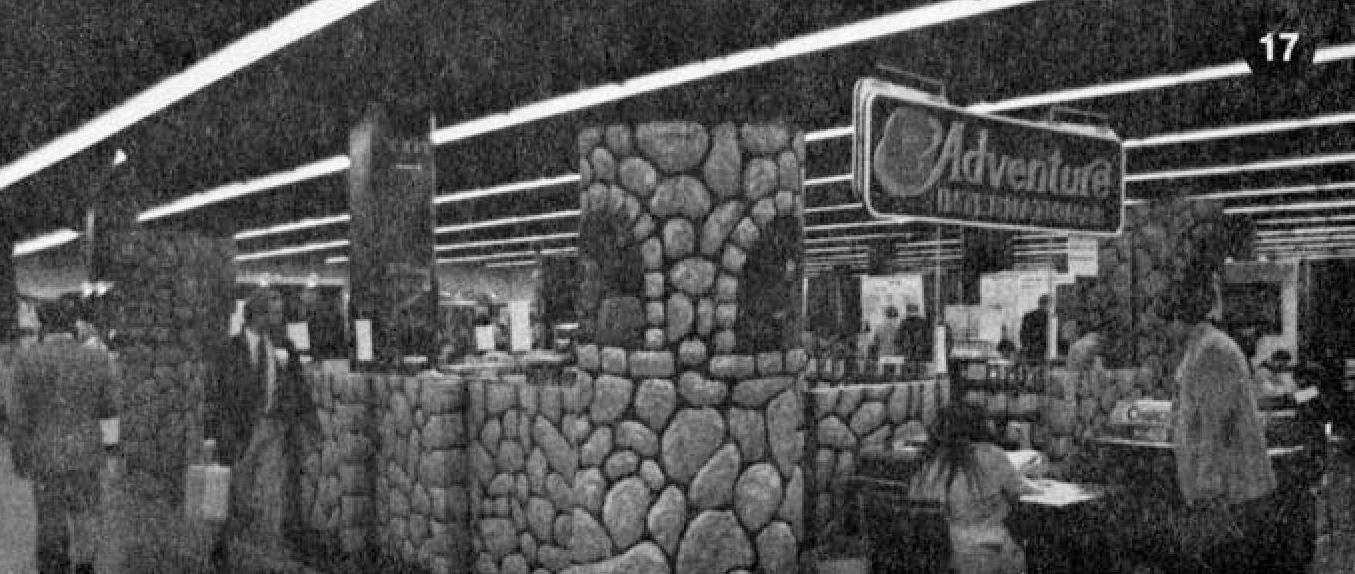
Adventure International at the 1982 West Coast Computer Faire.

In 1982, Adventure International began releasing Scott Adams Graphic Adventures for computers like the Apple II, while continuing to sell text-only games for less powerful computers such as the VIC-20 and TI 99/4A. Graphic adventures like The Hobbit increased expectations of such games, however, and Adventure International's graphic adventures were inferior to others resulting in a rapid loss of market share. At its peak in late 1983/early 1984, right at the cusp of the video game crash of 1983, Adventure International employed approximately 50 staff and published titles from over 300 independent programmer/authors.

Adventure International was based in the Sabal Point subdivision of Longwood - at 155 Sabal Palm Drive, Longwood, Florida near the east side of Sabal Point Elementary School. The company also had a retail store located in Sweetwater Oaks at 966 Fox Valley Drive, Longwood.

Adventure International went bankrupt in 1986. The copyrights for its games reverted to the bank and eventually back to Scott Adams who released them as shareware.

In Europe the "Adventure International" name was a trading name of Adventure Soft and other games were released under the name that were not from Adventure International in the US.

== Games ==
=== Scott Adams Adventure games ===
Scott Adams's original twelve adventure games were:

- Adventureland: Exploration of a fantasy landscape to collect thirteen treasures
- Pirate Adventure (also called Pirate's Cove): Hunt for lost pirate treasure
- Secret Mission (originally called Mission Impossible): Prevent terrorists from destroying a nuclear reactor
- Voodoo Castle: Free a count from a voodoo curse.
- The Count: Kill Count Dracula.
- Strange Odyssey: Explore strange planets and collect treasure.
- Mystery Fun House: Capture secret plans hidden in a fun house.
- Pyramid of Doom: Plunder an Egyptian pyramid.
- Ghost Town: Search a Western ghost town for treasure.
- Savage Island parts I & II: The most challenging adventure games, the player is not even aware of the game's goal. If the player completes part one, they are given one of two passwords to play the second part.
- The Golden Voyage: Sail the world to find the fountain of youth.

The games were developed using an in-house adventure editor. The original interpreter was a two-word command interpreter running on a Radio Shack TRS-80 computer, with later ports to many platforms. The source code for Adventureland was published in SoftSide magazine in 1980 and the source code for Pirate Adventure was printed in the December 1980 issue of BYTE, with an addendum in April 1981. This enabled others to discover how the engine worked and the database format was subsequently used in other interpreters such as Brian Howarth's Mysterious Adventures series. The 99/4A versions, published on disk or cassette by TI, require the Adventure Command Module cartridge. The later graphics versions (SAGA) featured graphics drawn on an Apple II, mostly by in-house artist Kem McNair.

=== Other games ===
- Lunar Lander (1980)
- Missile Attack (1980)
- Project Omega (1980)
- Slag (1980)
- The Eliminator (1981)
- Rear Guard (1981)
- Stone of Sisyphys (1981)
- Zossed in Space (1981)
- Airline (1982)
- Bug Off! (1982)
- Laser Ball (1982)
- Preppie! (1982)
- Reign of the Red Dragon (1982)
- Saigon: The Final Days (1982)
- Sea Dragon (1982)
- Triad (1982)
- Tutti Frutti (1982)
- AREX (1983)
- Preppie! II (1983)
- Rally Speedway (1983)
- The Adventures of Buckaroo Banzai Across the 8th Dimension (1983)
- Robin of Sherwood: The Touchstones of Rhiannon (1985)
