= Tom Hudson (programmer) =

American programmer

- Born: Springfield, Missouri
- Occupations: Programmer; Video game programmer
- Known for: 3D Studio; CAD-3D; DEGAS

Tom Hudson is an American programmer best known for co-creating the 3D modeling and animation package 3D Studio (which became 3D Studio Max, then Autodesk 3ds Max) as well as developing its precursor, CAD-3D for the Atari ST.

He began his career as a technical editor and programmer for Atari 8-bit computer magazine ANALOG Computing, where he wrote video games and utilities as type-in programs, including his first 3D rendering program, and tutorial columns for Atari BASIC and 6502 assembly language. He developed the software for the magazine's custom bulletin board system which ran on Atari 8-bit hardware. After the release of the Atari ST in 1985, he left ANALOG to create the bitmap paint program DEGAS, published by Batteries Included, and an enhanced version, Degas Elite.

Hudson drew the sample images for DEGAS and created the animated short, "Cornerstone", that shipped with 3D Studio.

== Early life ==
Tom Hudson was born in Springfield, Missouri and received a bachelor's degree from Southwest Missouri State University. The first computer he owned was a Compucolor II, which he learned to program on. He later bought an Atari 400.

== Career ==
=== ANALOG Computing ===
From 1982 until 1985, Hudson was a technical editor for ANALOG Computing, a magazine covering Atari 8-bit computers, based in Worcester, Massachusetts. While at ANALOG, he wrote a series of machine language games printed as type-in programs, including Fill 'er Up (based on Qix), Livewire! (based on Tempest), Retrofire!, Planetary Defense (co-written with Charles Bachand), and Fire Bug (co-written with Kyle Peacock). All games were accompanied by the assembly language source code. From issues 13 through 40, Hudson wrote a 6502 tutorial column called "Boot Camp." He also wrote a machine language monitor called HBUG, published in issue 18, for use by readers of the column.

In 1982, Hudson developed Buried Bucks (stylized as Buried Buck$), an action game sold commercially by the magazine under the name ANALOG Software. Buried Bucks was licensed to Imagic which enhanced and re-released it in 1984 as Chopper Hunt. In ANALOG Computing issue 8, Hudson presented a program called Graphic Violence! which creates visuals similar to the expanding explosions in Atari's 1980 Missile Command arcade game. That effect is used in both Buried Bucks and Planetary Defense.

In 1984 he wrote a 3D object viewer called Solid States for the Atari 8-bit computers, published in ANALOG #16. The Atari BASIC program lets the user enter a series of 3D points and connections between them and displays the result as a wireframe. The objects themselves are created on graph paper.

Hudson wrote the software for the ANALOG Telecommunications System, a subscription-only bulletin board system, which launched in May 1985. The system ran on multiple Atari 8-bit computers. ANALOG staffer Charles Bachand developed hardware allowing them to access the same hard drive.

=== Atari ST and beyond ===
Tom Hudson started writing a paint program for the new Atari 520ST while he was at ANALOG. He showed it to editor Michael Deschenes, who wasn't interested, so he kept developing it in his spare time. He contacted Batteries Included, a company which didn't have any ST software in its line-up. They wanted him to finish the program in six weeks, so he left ANALOG and returned to Missouri to focus on it. Batteries Included published it as DEGAS in 1985. He created an enhanced version, DEGAS Elite, released in 1986.

After DEGAS, Hudson wrote the 3D modeller CAD-3D for the Atari ST. It was published in 1986 by Antic Software, which was run by Gary Yost. CAD-3D started as a port of Solid States to the Atari ST. It was later renamed Cyber Studio and became the center of a suite of add-ons.

Hudson abandoned the Atari ST when expected improvements in the hardware did not occur. Working with Yost, Jack Powell, Dan Silva, and others, "The Yost Group" developed 3D Studio for MS-DOS-based IBM PC compatibles which was published in 1990 by Autodesk. The animated short Cornerstone, which shipped with 3D Studio, was created by Hudson.

=== Return to games ===
Under the name ANALOG Retro, Hudson teamed up with former magazine staffers Lee Pappas and Jon Bell to write the Star Raiders-inspired Star Rangers for iOS. It was released in 2010 and is no longer available.

In 2012, Hudson enhanced his Atari 8-bit Planetary Defense game to take advantage of modern emulators. Planetary Defense 2012 was announced in the AtariAge forums on September 2, 2012.

== Software ==
Atari 8-bit games

- Buried Bucks (1982), later released as Chopper Hunt
- Harvey Wallbanger (1982), with Charles Bachand
- Fill 'Er Up (1983)
- Livewire! (1983)
- Retrofire! (1983)
- Planetary Defense (1983), with Charles Bachand
- Fire Bug (1984), with Kyle Peacock
- Adventure at Vandenberg AFB (1985), text adventure
- Planetary Defense 2012

Atari 8-bit non-game software

- Solid States (1984), 3D object viewer
- HBUG: Hudson's Debugging Utility (1984), machine code monitor

Atari ST

- DEGAS (1985)
- DEGAS Elite (1986)
- CAD-3D (1986)

MS-DOS

- 3D Studio (1990), with Gary Yost, Dan Silva, Jack Powell, and others

iOS

- Star Rangers (2010)
