= Gary Yost =

American filmmaker and software designer

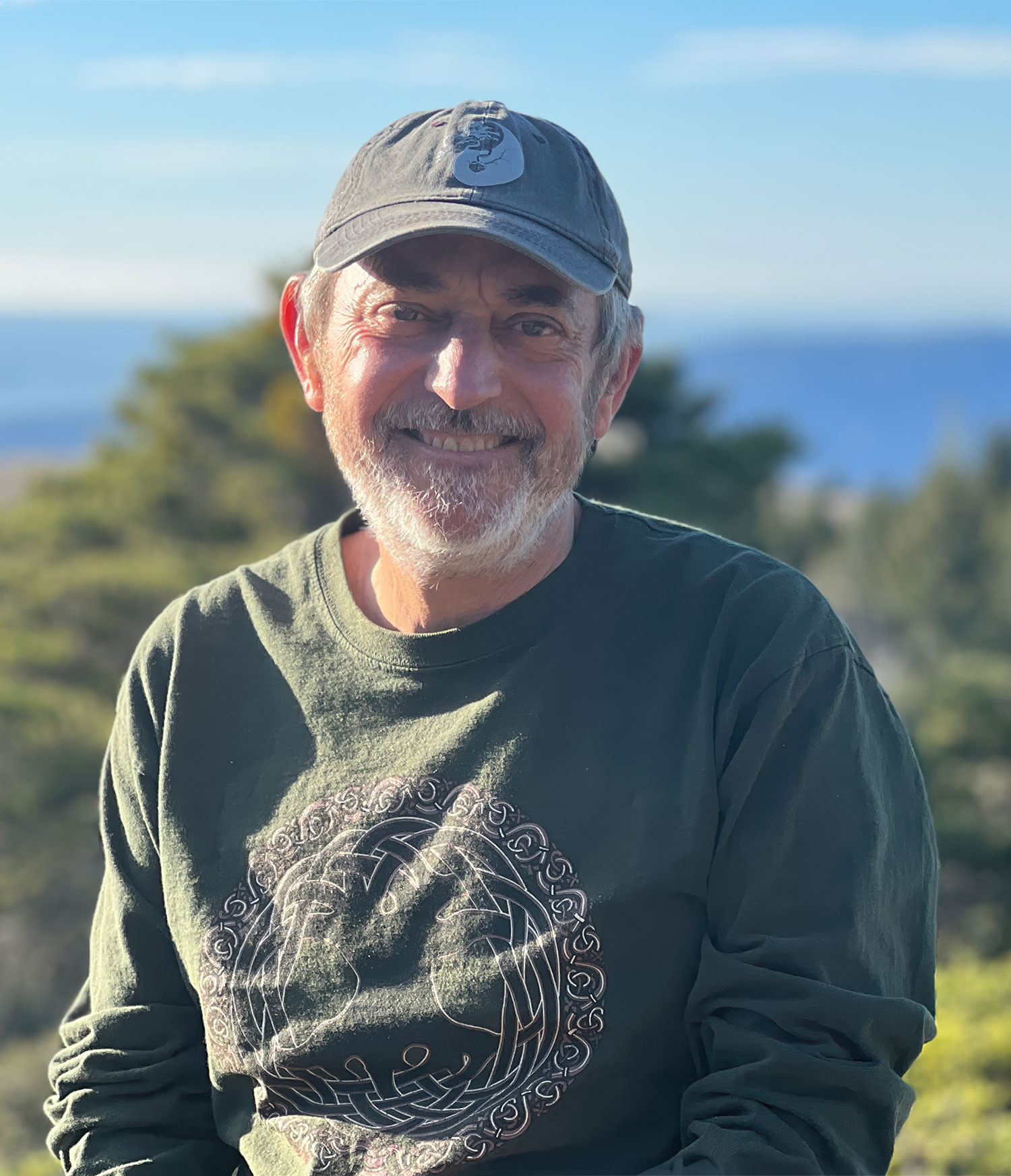
- Yost on Mt. Tamalpais, 2024
- Born: Gary Steven Yost
- Occupations: Filmmaker, Software Design
- Spouse: Sondra Davies-Yost
- Children: Ruby Yost
- Website: www.garyyost.com

Gary Yost (born 1959) is an American filmmaker, musician and software designer, best known for leading the team that created Autodesk 3ds Max.

== Early life ==
Raised in Closter, New Jersey, Yost attended Northern Valley Regional High School. At the age of 14 he won a photo competition in The Record for a black and white picture he took of a church being demolished on 42nd Street in New York City. This photo went on to win in the black and white category of the Kodak International Newspaper Photo competition.

== Antic Software ==
Yost created the Antic Software publishing unit for Antic Magazine in 1984 after Jack Tramiel bought Atari Computer from Warner Communications and shut down the Atari Program Exchange.

Yost met Tom Hudson at the Fall 1985 Comdex trade show and they began planning a suite of 3D animation tools for the Atari ST line of microcomputers, which became the Cyber Studio suite of animation products, beginning with CAD-3D 1.0, released autumn 1986. Stereo CAD-3D 2.0, released in late 1987, was built on an open-architecture framework and incorporated support for creating stereoscopic animations using the Tektronix “StereoTek” liquid crystal shutter 3D display. The StereoTek display was the first low-cost mass-market 3D display for microcomputers.

== The Yost Group, Autodesk and beyond ==
In 1988 Yost left Antic Software to form “The Yost Group” when Autodesk offered him a software licensing agreement to create a suite of affordable animation tools for the IBM PC, beginning with Autodesk 3D Studio and Autodesk Animator, which was a 2D cel animation tool written by Jim Kent for The Yost Group. An obscure fact about Yost in 1988 is that, along with Computer Graphics pioneer Jim Blinn, he played percussion on the Todd Rundgren album "Nearly Human," which was recorded at Fantasy Studios in Berkeley, California.

Working with Tom Hudson, Jack Powell, Dan Silva, Rolf Berteig and Gus Grubba, Yost led the team that created Autodesk 3D Studio versions 1-4 for the MS-DOS platform. Don Brittain, former VP of Research for Wavefront Technologies, was brought into the Yost Group to help create the re-designed 3D animation program called Autodesk 3ds Max, based on the Microsoft Windows NT platform and it was first shown at the Association for Computing Machinery’s SIGGRAPH conference in Los Angeles in 1995 before its 1996 release.

Yost and his engineering team applied for and received eight US patents for the technology they invented for Autodesk 3ds Max and in 1997 they sold their rights to the source code and inventions to Autodesk, ending Yost’s involvement with the product.

In 2004 Yost joined Berlin-based mental images, GmbH & Co. as Executive Vice President of their US-based operation. Yost and mental images’ founder Rolf Herken had formed a relationship when Yost licensed the mental ray rendering library and other software components from mental images for Autodesk 3ds Max. mental images was acquired by NVIDIA, and Yost’s involvement wound down by 2011.

In 2013, Yost joined Rolf Herken’s Mine Innovation as an engineering advisor.

In 2020, Yost was interviewed about his life's experience in CGI on the 300th episode of the CG Garage VFX podcast.

== Photography, filmmaking and virtual reality. ==
Yost has been a photographer for over 50 years and began pursuing photography more seriously in 2012 when he created the viral video “A Day in the Life of a Fire Lookout,” about the Gardner Fire Lookout on Mt. Tamalpais in Marin County, California. That video won a Vimeo Staff Pick award.

He spent seven years working with the Marin Municipal Water District and the Golden Gate National Parks Conservancy on a trilogy of films about Ground Equipment Facility J-33, the abandoned Mill Valley Air Force Station on the West Peak of Mount Tamalpais in Marin County, California. Yost's Mt. Tamalpais film series covers a wide range of topics, including a short doc about artist Zio Ziegler and his Mill Valley mural that was inspired by the Sitting Bull monument on Mt. Tam.

The first film in the trilogy, “The Invisible Peak” was created by Yost with help from Peter Coyote and George Daly. It has been a selection at 16 film festivals, was featured on over 100 PBS stations in the US as part of the KRCB-produced Natural Heroes series and has won awards for Best Documentary, Best of Show, and Outstanding Environmental Vision. The capstone work in Yost's Mt. Tamalpais West Peak series is "The Way it's Supposed to Be" featuring performances by Marin County musicians Bob Weir, Maria Muldaur, Ramblin' Jack Elliott and Matt Jaffe

In addition to the filmmaking work he has accomplished on Mt. Tamalpais, Yost has been working on films that document the cultural life of Fijians in 2015.

His other videos include a project with Puddles the Clown, which has garnered 10 million views on YouTube and an innovative use of infrared cinematography for a project with the YASSOU band, featuring synchronized swimmers from LA-based Aqualillies. Yost has been actively promoting the use of time-lapse to tell stories, and was a judge for the LA-based 2016 Timelapse Film Festival along with Godfrey Reggio, the producer of the seminal time-lapse film Koyaanisqatsi. Yost used the public ALERT Wildfire remote camera system to create a series of time-lapse videos of remote places in California using innovative techniques to scrape still frames from the camera network, outlined in a detailed tutorial on how it was accomplished.

In 2017 Yost was the recipient of the Mill Valley Creative Achievement "Milley" award from the Mill Valley, California Arts Commission, joining previous recipients including Dan Hicks (singer), John Korty, Joyce Maynard, Sammy Hagar, Jane Hirshfield, Jerry Harrison and Bob Weir.

In both 2018 and 2019 Yost won the Best Indie Filmmaker reader's choice award in Marin County, California from the Pacific Sun (newspaper) and he began working in the field of immersive cinema. He was the director of photography for "Circle of Dreams," a virtual reality project with the legendary SF-based art collective The Residents.

== The WisdomVR Project and Inside COVID19 ==
Yost launched the nonprofit WisdomVR Project as a 501(c)(3) with strategic partnership support from Oculus VR and the Long Now Foundation in early 2019. As of September 2019, WisdomVR participants include Ram Dass, Betty Reid Soskin, Gavin de Becker, Peter Coyote, Shelton Johnson, Gaelynn Lea, L. Frank Manriquez, Anna Halprin, Todd Rundgren, Wavy Gravy, Joan Jeanrenaud, Malcolm Margolin, Reuben Heyday Margolin, John Law (artist), Stanislav Grof, Huey Johnson and Pearl E. Gates from Pearl Harbor and the Explosions.

In late 2020 the 501(c)(3) WisdomVR Project launched the stereoscopic 360° documentary Inside COVID19, funded by Oculus (brand), which told the story of an American ER doctor who nearly died from the novel coronavirus and featured over 10 minutes of 360° stereoscopic molecular animation designed by Andrew Murdock and created in Autodesk 3ds Max. Alvy Ray Smith, co-founder of Pixar, stated “WisdomVR's 'Inside COVID19' production was excellent and the interviews felt more intimate than normal (hence showing off VR in an unexpected way). The computer graphics were stunning, and the best explanation I’ve seen of COVID at work. It shows what really can be done in this new medium.” and John Carmack, founding CTO of Oculus tweeted "Inside COVID19 is a high production value documentary that just happens to be done in stereo 360, rather than a tentative exploration of a new medium. Things are maturing.” The Inside COVID19 VR documentary was nominated for the 2021 Emmy Awards in the Outstanding Interactive Program category, won the Festival of International Virtual & Augmented Reality Stories "People's Choice" award for best immersive video in February 2021, is a 2021 Webby Awards Honoree and was selected to be featured in the 2021 SIGGRAPH VR Theater.

== Blending poetry, original music and video about Mt. Tamalpais. ==
Described by the Marin Independent Journal as a "handpan virtuoso," Yost released a series of devotional original musical videos dedicated to Mt. Tamalpais entitled “Songs from the Last Place” in August 2024, inspired by the beat poet Lew Welch’s “The Song Mt. Tamalpais Sings.” The project's foundational video was featured at the Bolinas Film Festival in September 2024.
