= DEGAS (software) =

Bitmap graphics editor for the Atari ST

- Original author: Tom Hudson
- Developer: Batteries Included
- Release: 1985; 41 years ago
- Stable release: DEGAS Elite / 1986; 40 years ago
- Operating system: Atari ST
- Type: Bitmap graphics editor

DEGAS (D.E.G.A.S., Design & Entertainment Graphic Arts System) is a bitmap graphics editor created by Tom Hudson for the Atari ST and published by Batteries Included in 1985. Hudson created some of the sample paintings that shipped with DEGAS.

== Development ==
The working title of DEGAS was HUDraw, where "HUD" stood for "Hudson."

Gary Yost of Antic Software wanted to publish DEGAS, but Hudson chose Batteries Included because "they were, in my opinion, the best Atari software company at the time." Yost and Antic Software published Hudson's next program, CAD 3D.

== File formats ==
Extension	Resolution	Colours	Type
*.pc1	320×200	16 colours	compressed
*.pc2	640×200	4 colours	compressed
*.pc3	640×400	2 colours	compressed
*.pi1	320×200	16 colours	uncompressed
*.pi2	640×200	4 colours	uncompressed
*.pi3	640×400	2 colours	uncompressed

== Legacy ==
DEGAS Elite v1.1, lo-res menu

Antic magazine published winners of an art competition for those using the software in July 1986.

DEGAS was followed in 1986 with DEGAS Elite. It adds multiple work screens, color-cycling animation, and other features.

== See also ==
- NeoChrome
