= PaperClip =

1982 word processor

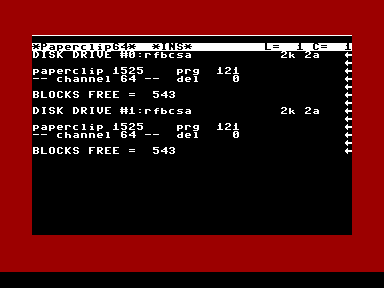
- Original author(s): Commodore 64; Steve Douglas; Atari 8-bit Steve Ahlstrom; Dan Moore
- Developer(s): Batteries Included
- Initial release: 1982; 43 years ago
- Platform: Commodore 64 / 128, Atari 8-bit

PaperClip is a word processor for the Commodore 64, 128 (native mode), and Atari 8-bit computers published by Batteries Included in 1985. In the UK it was published by Ariolasoft.

Both the Atari and Commodore versions share the PaperClip name, but have significant differences. The Commodore 64 version of PaperClip was written by Steve Douglas and was rewritten for the Atari personal computer by Steve Ahlstrom and Dan Moore. The Atari version is based upon the editor in the Action! programming language by Clinton Parker.

PaperClip is also the name given to the text editor ROM portion of the Commodore PET Execudesk office suite. The ROM was written by Steve Douglas as well.

== Features ==
PaperClip does not use word wrap to display text on the screen, which Ahoy!'s reviewer wrote was satisfactory for Commodore 64 users with 40-column displays but drew the ire of the reviewer for Whole Earth Software Catalog while highlighting OMNIWRITER's support for same. The Commodore 64 version provides an 80-column preview mode with text that was legible on a computer monitor, and supported a wide variety of Commodore and non-Commodore printers.

The software was supplied with a dongle, a hardware key used for copy protection that plugged into the Atari joystick port, also present on the C64. A keyless version was also available. An EPROM was also used for copy protection on the PET. Other programs that used such a method just checked for a couple of specific bytes of data in the EPROM, and this check was easily bypassed by a small change to the code. PaperClip, however, placed all the user messages in the EPROM. Thus no EPROM, and no messages.

One unusual aspect of PaperClip is that the Control key functions more like on a hand-held calculator. You have to press and release the Control key, then press the key for the appropriate function.

== Reception ==
Ahoy! wrote that "PaperClip is one of the most comprehensive word processing programs for the C-64", but noted the $125 list price.

Antic called PaperClip, "by far the best word processor ever available for the Atari." In the December 1986 shopper's guide, a staffer wrote, "We write and edit every word at Antic with PaperClip before transmitting the copy to our typesetter via modem."
