= Transmembrane protein 175 =

TMEM175

Identifiers
- Aliases: TMEM175, htransmembrane protein 175
- External IDs: OMIM: 616660; MGI: 1919642; HomoloGene: 12461; GeneCards: TMEM175; OMA:TMEM175 - orthologs

Gene location (Human)
Chr.	Chromosome 4 (human)
Band	4p16.3	Start	932,387 bp
Band	4p16.3	End	958,656 bp

Gene location (Mouse)
Chr.	Chromosome 5 (mouse)
Band	5|5 F	Start	108,777,636 bp
Band	5|5 F	End	108,796,648 bp
RNA expression pattern
Bgee	Human / Mouse (ortholog); Top expressed in: right hemisphere of cerebellum; granulocyte; anterior pituitary; right frontal lobe; apex of heart; C1 segment; Brodmann area 9; spleen; right lobe of thyroid gland; right lobe of liver / Top expressed in: spermatocyte; spermatid; right kidney; seminiferous tubule; superior frontal gyrus; zygote; secondary oocyte; primary visual cortex; proximal tubule; lumbar spinal ganglion; More reference expression data
BioGPS	n/a
Gene ontology
Molecular function	potassium ion leak channel activity; potassium channel activity
Cellular component	integral component of membrane; lysosomal membrane; endosome; lysosome; endosome membrane; membrane
Biological process	potassium ion transport; regulation of lysosomal lumen pH; phagosome-lysosome fusion; ion transport; potassium ion transmembrane transport; transport
Sources:Amigo / QuickGO
Orthologs
Species	Human	Mouse
Entrez	84286	72392
Ensembl	ENSG00000127419	ENSMUSG00000013495
UniProt	Q9BSA9	Q9CXY1
RefSeq (mRNA)	NM_001297423; NM_001297424; NM_001297425; NM_001297426; NM_001297427 NM_001297428; NM_032326	NM_001163531; NM_001163532; NM_028223; NM_001359423; NM_001359426 NM_001359427
RefSeq (protein)	NP_001284352; NP_001284353; NP_001284354; NP_001284355; NP_001284356 NP_001284357; NP_115702	NP_001157003; NP_001157004; NP_082499; NP_001346352; NP_001346355 NP_001346356
Location (UCSC)	Chr 4: 0.93 – 0.96 Mb	Chr 5: 108.78 – 108.8 Mb
PubMed search
- Wikidata
View/Edit Human	View/Edit Mouse

Transmembrane protein 175

Identifiers
- Symbol: TMEM175
- Pfam: PF06736
- InterPro: IPR010617
- TCDB: 1.A.78
- OPM superfamily: 467
- OPM protein: 5vre
Available protein structures:
- PDB: IPR010617 PF06736 (ECOD; PDBsum)
- AlphaFold: IPR010617; PF06736

Transmembrane protein 175

Identifiers
- Symbol: TMEM175
- Alt. symbols: MGC4618
- NCBI gene: 84286
- HGNC: 28709
- RefSeq: NM_032326
- UniProt: Q9BSA9

Other data
- Locus: Chr. 4 p16.3
Search for
- Structures: Swiss-model
- Domains: InterPro

Transmembrane protein 175, or TMEM175, is a transmembrane protein that is thought to be an endolysosomal potassium channel. It is predicted to have many orthologs across eukaryotes.

== Expression ==
Based on human and mouse EST profiles and a human tissue GEO profile, TMEM175 appears to be expressed at a relatively high level (75-98%) in normal tissues. TMEM175 appears to be down regulated in stage three ovarian cancer.

== Homology ==
Transmembrane protein 175 has no paralogs. It does have orthologs within eukaryotes. The following table presents some of the orthologs found using searches in BLAST and BLAT. This list does not contain all of the orthologs for TMEM175. It is meant to display the diversity of species for which orthologs are found.

Scientific name	Common name	Accession number	Sequence length	Percent identity	Percent Similarity
Homo Sapiens	Human	NP_115702.1	504	-	-
Pan troglodytes	Chimp	XP_001141076	504	92	93
Pongo abelii	Orangutan	XP_002814537	231	99	99
Macaca mulatta	Rhesus	XP_001085173.1	403	96	98
Callithrix jacchus	Marmoset	XP_002746113.1	472	83	87
Bos taurus	Cow	NP_001069081.1	479	77	82
Ailuropoda melanoleuca	Panda	XP_002924455.1	498	81	87
Equus caballus	Horse	XP_001488271.1	499	81	86
Rattus norvegicus	Rat	NP_001014013.1	499	82	88
Mus musculus	Mouse	NP_082499.3	499	81	88
Monodelphis domestica	Opossum	XP_001377424.1	502	67	80
Ornithorhynchus anatinus	Platypus	XP_001514176	499	68	82
Gallus gallus	Chicken	NP_001006582.1	501	64	78
Sceloporus occidentalis	Lizard	-	417	56	66
Taeniopygia guttata	Zebra Finch	XP_002187908.1	496	66	79
Danio rerio	Zebra Fish	NP_001093545.1	520	62	76
Branchiostoma floridae	Lancelet	XP_002596272	409	31	50
Ciona intestinalis	Sea Squirt	XP_002122718	494	27	50
Nematostella vectensis	Starlet Sea Anemone	XP_001630719	489	28	49

== Predicted Post-Translational Modification ==
Using various tools at ExPASy the following are possible post-translational modifications for TMEM175.

- 5 possible CK2 phosphorylation sites
- 2 possible PKC phosphorylation sites
- N-myristoylation sites around transmembrane regions

The N-myristoylation sites are conserved in vertebrates.
