= FLIC (file format) =

File format family

- Filename extension: .fli, .flc
- Uniform Type Identifier (UTI): public.flc-animation
- Developed by: Autodesk
- Initial release: 1989; 37 years ago
- Type of format: computer animation

The FLIC file formats most known in the extension .FLI and .FLC, used to store animation files. It is similar to animated GIF. The FLIC animation format was originally developed by Autodesk for use with Autodesk Animator (FLI) and Autodesk Animator Pro (FLC). In 1993 Jim Kent had a Dr. Dobbs article with a source code listing, introducing the FLIC format to the public.

The format uses pixel-wise differential encoding between frames (like GIF) to reduce file size.

In the 1990s video game developers used the format for intros and other animated sequences in their games, for instance UFO: Enemy Unknown (1994) by MicroProse.

Autodesk released a Freeware software called AAPlay to play FLI/FLC files on the PC. After the end of development and support by Autodesk, the community wrote substitutes themselves, for instance free and open source libraries for writing and reading FLI/FLC.
