= TKO Pro Boxing =

1990 computer game

- Developer(s): Shannon Lynn, Jim Trunzo, Thomas Trunzo
- Publisher(s): Lance Haffner Games
- Release: 1990
- Genre(s): Boxing

TKO Pro Boxing is a 1990 computer game published by Lance Haffner Games and designed by Shannon Lynn with Jim and Thomas Trunzo.

== Gameplay ==
TKO Pro Boxing is a text-only boxing game with over 600 boxers including retired boxers at various career stages and they can challenge each other across eras. Player can alter the strategy of their boxer between rounds. The game displays text commentary during rounds, shows punch totals after every round, and displays the full scoring when the fight is over. The game has a "pre-fight condition" option which can show how much a boxer has trained for the fight.

== Publication history ==
TKO Pro Boxing was designed by Lance Haffner Games of Nashville, Tennessee.

Jim Trunzo also designed Title Bout from Avalon Hill, and Title Fight Pro Boxing.

== Reception ==
Wallace Poulter reviewed the game for Computer Gaming World, and stated that "Those who like other Lance Haffner games and/or find themselves serious about the sport of boxing should seriously consider adding this product to their stable of sports games."

The book The PC Games Bible stated that this game was "Recommended for fight fans."
