= Preppie! II =

1983 video game

- Developer: Star Systems Software
- Publisher: Adventure International
- Designer: Russ Wetmore
- Writer: Mark Murley (manual)
- Platform: Atari 8-bit
- Release: 1983
- Genre: Maze

Preppie! II is a video game written by Russ Wetmore for Atari 8-bit computers and published by Adventure International in 1983. Subtitled "The continuing saga of Wadsworth Overcash", it is a sequel to 1982's Frogger-inspired Preppie!. The game loosely continues the preppy theme, primarily through a story in the manual, but replaces the country club setting with an abstract, overhead view maze. Some obstacles from the first game appear in the second.

Russ Wetmore stopped writing games after Preppie! II and developed the HomePak application suite. In 2016, he made the source code for Preppie! II publicly available.

== Gameplay ==
Gameplay screenshot

Preppie! II is a maze game. Walking changes the floor to a different color, and the goal is to paint the entire maze. Revolving doors rotate when pushed, changing the shape of the maze. Radioactive frogs, golf carts, and reel mowers from the first game are deadly to the touch. The joystick button activates a time-limited cloaking effect which allows the character to walk through enemies and the revolving doors without activating them.

Each level consists of three connected, fullscreen mazes with differing layouts and obstacles. The player switches mazes at will via passages at the edges of each. When all three have been completed, they repeat with higher difficulty.

== Development ==
The last page of the manual lists the tools that Wetmore used to create the game. These include the Atari Macro Assembler, Atari Assembler Editor, BUG/65 from Optimized Systems Software, Atari Program Text Editor, and Datasoft's Micropainter.

== Reception ==
New Zealand magazine Bits & Bytes called Preppie! II "a surprisingly difficult maze program." Reviewer Michael Fletcher complimented the graphics and music and wrote that "The game play is exciting and often amusing, especially when you are stomped on by a frog." Bill Kunkel and Arnie Katz were also impressed by the visuals: "The graphics in Preppie! II are no more spectacular than in Preppie!. Of course that's like saying that the special effects in George Lucas' latest movie are no more spectacular than Star Wars". The bold statement "Preppie! II is what computer arcading is all about" ends the review.

Steve Harding wrote for Hi-Res, "Mark Murley's documentation is almost worth the program's suggested retail price of $34.95. It is well written and humorous." He concluded with, "Adventure International and Wetmore are to be commended for a job well done." Computer Games called it "fresher than the original," giving an overall rating of "B".

== See also ==
- Make Trax (1981), a game with the goal of painting the maze
- Lady Bug (1981), a maze game with revolving doors
