= Lee H. Pappas =

American video game designer (born 1957)

Lee H. Pappas (born 1957) is an American entrepreneur and founder of several technology publications. He co-founded Atari 8-bit computer enthusiast magazine ANALOG Computing in 1981. ANALOG also produced a line of video games, including Buried Bucks which was later licensed to Imagic and published as Chopper Hunt. After the Atari ST was released, ANALOG spun off a magazine for that computer: ST-Log. VideoGames & Computer Entertainment also started as a section within ANALOG Computing before becoming a separate publication. Pappas later founded print magazines PC Laptop, TurboPlay, VISIO, Picture This!, Popular Home Automation!, and Home Theater Builder.

Other work included projects for various companies including Walt Disney Publishing and the science monthly Discover Magazine. After moving away from magazine publishing in 2010, he was the producer for the video game StarRangers under the company ANALOGretro working with several former ANALOG alumni including Tom Hudson and Jon Bell.

Later he was involved with projects for Enflight, which produces navigation software for pilots, and Interbit Data, which develops software tools for the healthcare industry.
