= Transmembrane protein 53 =

Protein found in humans

TMEM53

Identifiers
- Aliases: TMEM53, NET4, transmembrane protein 53, CTDI
- External IDs: MGI: 1916027; GeneCards: TMEM53

Gene location (Human)
| Chr. | Chromosome 1 (human) |
| Band | 1p34.1 | Start | 44,635,238 bp |
| Band | 1p34.1 | End | 44,674,481 bp |

Gene location (Mouse)
| Chr. | Chromosome 4 (mouse) |
| Band | 4|4 D1 | Start | 117,109,148 bp |
| Band | 4|4 D1 | End | 117,125,779 bp |
RNA expression pattern
| Bgee | Human / Mouse (ortholog); Top expressed in: right lobe of liver; mucosa of transverse colon; sperm; left testis; right testis; gonad; epithelium of nasopharynx; testicle; apex of heart; prefrontal cortex / Top expressed in: seminiferous tubule; spermatid; right kidney; vestibular membrane of cochlear duct; proximal tubule; adrenal gland; spermatocyte; left lobe of liver; human kidney; brown adipose tissue; More reference expression data |
| BioGPS | n/a |
Orthologs
| Databases | NCBI: entry; OMA: entry |
| Species | Human | Mouse |
| Entrez | 79639 | 68777 |
| Ensembl | ENSG00000126106 | ENSMUSG00000048772 |
| UniProt | Q6P2H8 | Q9D0Z3 |
| RefSeq (mRNA) | NM_001300746; NM_001300747; NM_001300748; NM_024587 | NM_001285812; NM_001285814; NM_001285815; NM_001285816; NM_026837 NM_029589 |
| RefSeq (protein) | NP_001287675; NP_001287676; NP_001287677; NP_078863 | NP_001272741; NP_001272743; NP_001272744; NP_001272745; NP_081113 NP_083865 |
| Location (UCSC) | Chr 1: 44.64 – 44.67 Mb | Chr 4: 117.11 – 117.13 Mb |
| PubMed search |
- Wikidata
| View/Edit Human | View/Edit Mouse |

transmembrane protein 53

Identifiers
- Symbol: TMEM53
- Alt. symbols: FLJ22353, RP4-678E16.2
- NCBI gene: 79639
- HGNC: 26186
- RefSeq: NP_078863
- UniProt: Q6P2H8

Other data
- Locus: Chr. 1 p34.1
Search for
- Structures: Swiss-model
- Domains: InterPro

Transmembrane protein 53, or TMEM53, is a protein that is encoded on chromosome 1 in humans. It has no paralogs but is predicted to have many orthologs across eukaryotes.

== Properties and structure ==
=== General properties ===
- DUF829 makes up 87% of TMEM53's length
- Contains a transmembrane domain but lacks a signal peptide
- Molecular weight 31.6 kilodaltons
- Isoelectric point 8.56
- Leucine-rich (14.4% of amino acids are leucines)
- Predicted to be localized to the nucleus

=== Secondary structure ===
The secondary structure of TMEM53 is predicted to consist of alternating pairs of alpha helices and beta sheets.

=== Alternative splicing ===
TMEM53 has 3 exons. Twelve alternative splice forms have been identified using 26 alternative exons. The following table includes the predicted post-translational modifications for each isoform.

| AceView Splice Form | # Amino Acids | % ID with RefSeq | # of Clones Found | DUF829 | CK2 sites | PKC sites | Tyr sites | Pumilio site | N-Myristoylation sites | Extras (not comparable to RefSeq) |
|---|---|---|---|---|---|---|---|---|---|---|
| a | 277 | RefSeq | 64 | X | 2 | 3 | 1 | 1 | 2 | |
| b | 247 | 88.8% | 6 | X | 2 | 2 | 1 | 1 | 2 | |
| c | 204 | 64.4% | 1 | X | 2 | 1 | 1 | 1 | 2 | Microbody C-terminal targeting signal |
| d | 204 | 73.6% | 10 | X | 2 | 2 | 1 | 1 | 1 | |
| e | 223 | 57.5% | 2 | X | 1 | 4 | | | 3 | |
| f | 143 | 21.4% | 1 | X | 1 | 3 | | | 3 | Amidation site, Asn glycosylation site, cAMP-dependent phosphorylation site |
| g | 142 | n/a | 1 | | 1 | 3 | | | 1 | |
| h | 137 | 45.1% | 2 | X | 1 | 3 | | | 2 | Protein prenyltransferase repeat |
| i | 129 | 32.1% | 1 | X | | 4 | | | 2 | |
| j | 139 | 27.2% | 21 | X | | 2 | | | 3 | |
| k | 110 | n/a | 1 | | 1 | 4 | | | 3 | Amidation site, Asn glycosylation site, cAMP-dependent phosphorylation site |
| l | 106 | n/a | 5 | | | | | | 3 | |

== Function ==
The function of TMEM53 is not fully understood. It contains a domain of unknown function, DUF829, which is approximately 240 amino acids long. This domain has not been found in proteins other than TMEM53 and its orthologs.

=== Expression ===
Based on human and mouse EST profiles and a human tissue GEO profile, TMEM53 appears to be expressed ubiquitously at low levels in both normal and cancerous tissues.

More specific expression patterns have also been observed:

- Expressed in mice at higher levels in dorsal root ganglia than in the spinal cord
- Expressed at lower levels in brain tissue with Huntington's disease than in normal brain tissue
- Expressed at very low levels in the mouse brain, with the areas of highest detectable expression being the hypothalamus, pons, midbrain, and amygdala

=== Homology ===
Transmembrane protein 53 has no paralogs. It does, however, have orthologs extending throughout eukaryotes, from primates to amoeba. The following table presents a selection of orthologs found using searches in BLAST and BLAT. It is not a comprehensive list, but rather a small selection meant to display the diversity of species in which orthologs are found.

| Scientific name | Common name | Accession number | Sequence length | Percent identity | Percent Similarity |
|---|---|---|---|---|---|
| Homo sapiens | Human | NP_078863 | 277 aa | - | - |
| Macaca mulatta | Rhesus monkey | XP_001093396.1 | 204 aa | 97% | 98% |
| Canis lupus familiaris | Dog | XP_539639.2 | 278 aa | 88% | 92% |
| Mus musculus | Mouse | NP_081113.1 | 276 aa | 86% | 91% |
| Monodelphis domestica | Opossum | XP_001376124.1 | 405 aa | 69% | 82% |
| Gallus gallus | Chicken | XP_422420.1 | 276 aa | 56% | 70% |
| Xenopus laevis | Frog | NP_001086490.1 | 285 aa | 54% | 69% |
| Danio rerio | Zebrafish | NP_001002637.1 | 281 aa | 47% | 66% |
| Ciona intestinalis | Sea squirt | XP_002127410.1 | 290 aa | 37% | 51% |
| Drosophila melanogaster | Fruit fly | NP_610178.2 | 368 aa | 35% | 56% |
| Apis mellifera | Honey bee | XP_392954.1 | 326 aa | 32% | 52% |
| Strongylocentrotus purpuratus | Purple sea urchin | XP_788598.1 | 287 aa | 32% | 52% |
| Oryza sativa | Rice | EEC81354.1 | 412 aa | 31% | 45% |
| Nematostella vectensis | Sea anemone | XP_001628968.1 | 242 aa | 29% | 52% |
| Populus trichocarpa | Black cottonwood | XP_002306371.1 | 443 aa | 29% | 45% |
| Aspergillus nidulans | Fungus | XP_657927.1 | 285 aa | 27% | 44% |
| Dictyostelium discoideum | Amoeba | XP_644630.1 | 354 aa | 27% | 44% |

Based on ClustalW multiple sequence alignments of 38 orthologs, including the ones above, 11 amino acids are completely conserved throughout all species with this protein.

=== Predicted post-translational modification ===
Using bioinformatic analysis tools like MyHits Motif Scan and various tools at ExPASy and comparing to multiple sequence alignments, highly conserved potential sites of post-translational modification were identified. The following is not a comprehensive list of predicted modification sites; it includes only the ones that use highly conserved amino acids.

- CK2 phosphorylation sites 140–143, 217–220
- Tyrosine phosphorylation sites 209–216, 263
- PKC phosphorylation site 19–21 conserved in mammals
- N-myristoylation site 27–32 conserved in mammals
- N-myristoylation site 153–158 conserved in vertebrates

T216, the tyrosine for a tyrosine phosphorylation site, and S217, the serine for a predicted CK2 phosphorylation site, are completely conserved throughout the protein's evolutionary history. This suggests high likelihood that these sites are real and important for the protein's function.
