= Russ Wetmore =

American computer programmer and video game designer

- Wetmore in 1986
- Born: October 17, 1956 (age 70); Sagamihara, Japan
- Occupations: Software engineer Video game designer
- Known for: Preppie! HomePak

Russ Wetmore is an American software engineer and video game designer best known for writing commercial games and applications for Atari 8-bit computers in the early to mid 1980s. His Frogger-inspired Preppie! was published by Adventure International and praised by reviewers for the music and visuals. He also wrote the maze-game sequel Preppie! II. Wetmore stopped writing games after the video game crash of 1983 and developed the integrated HomePak productivity suite for Batteries Included. He has remained in software development in director and architecture roles.

== Education ==
Interested in classical music, Wetmore majored in music composition at Morehead State University, from 1973 to 1975, until running out of money.

== Game development ==
Wetmore taught himself to program on a TRS-80 and, with Phil Oliver, started TRS-80 software publisher The Cornsoft Group. Wetmore met Adventure International founder Scott Adams at a trade show in 1981 and was hired as a liaison for external game authors. Adams and Wetmore collaborated on Savage Island Part Two, published in 1981 as the eleventh entry in the Scott Adams Adventure series. When Wetmore became interested in developing his own arcade-inspired games, Adams loaned him an Atari 800.

Wetmore's first commercial game was Preppie! for the Atari 8-bit computers, released in 1982. Preppie! is a variant of Konami's Frogger themed with the preppy fad of the early 1980s. The game received positive reviews, especially for the visuals and music. "By Russ Wetmore" is prominently displayed on the box cover, resulting in Wetmore becoming a recognized name in Atari game programming.

He ported the underwater, horizontally scrolling shooter Sea Dragon to Atari 8-bit computers (1982). The TRS-80 original, by Wayne Westmoreland and Terry Gilman, draws the undersea terrain as monochrome outlines, while the Atari version adds colorful, filled graphics. Wetmore designed and programmed, Preppie! II, released in 1983. It keeps the preppy theming and protagonist of the original, but involves coloring three mazes by moving through them. All three of Wetmore's games were developed under the name Star Systems Software and published by Adventure International.

In a 1983 interview with Electronic Games, he mentioned a third Preppie! game—Preppies in Space—and another project:

"My next game will be really esoteric," Wetmore confides. "It will involve a three-dimensional room filled with bouncing balls which the player must drop through holes in the floor."

Neither game was completed. Wetmore wrote in 2005 that Preppies in Space was only a concept.

Following his appearance on the ANTIC Podcast in January 2016, Wetmore released the Atari 8-bit source code for Preppie, Preppie II, and Sea Dragon to the Internet Archive. Also made available was a demo for an unfinished Atari 8-bit game, Lulu.

== After games ==
As a result of the video game crash of 1983, Wetmore stopped writing games. He was also unhappy about the level of software piracy at the time; his port of Sea Dragon was circulating before its official release.

His next project was the integrated application suite HomePak for the Atari 8-bit computers. It contains a word processor (HomeText), database (HomeFind), and terminal communications program (HomeTerm). HomePak was published by Batteries Included in 1984. It is one of the few commercial products written in the Action! programming language from Optimized Systems Software.

With Sparky Starks, programmer of the 1982 game Bug Off!, Wetmore co-authored HomeCard, an Atari 8-bit application advertised as an "electronic filing box" and "intelligent Rolodex." It was published by Antic Software in 1985.

Wetmore wrote short-lived columns for Atari computer magazines Hi-Res ("Advanced User Forum") and ANALOG Computing ("On Line").

He has since worked as a software architect and director of software development for a variety of companies, including Apple Computer.

== Software developed ==
=== Games ===
- Adventure #11: Savage Island Part Two (1981), with Scott Adams
- Preppie! (1982)
- Sea Dragon (1982), port from TRS-80
- Preppie! II (1983)

=== Productivity ===
- HomePak (1984)
- HomeCard (1985) with Sparky Starks
