= HomePak =

- Original author: Russ Wetmore
- Developers: Batteries Included; Ariolasoft (EU)
- Initial release: 1984; 42 years ago
- Written in: Action!
- Platform: Atari 8-bit, Apple II, Commodore 64 / 128, PCjr

HomePak, published in 1984 by Batteries Included, is an integrated application written for the Atari 8-bit computers and ported to the Commodore 64, Commodore 128, IBM PCjr, and the Apple II, as well as for early Macintosh ("The Mac HomePak"). It includes a word processor (HomeText), database (HomeFind), and terminal communications program (HomeTerm). HomePak was designed by Russ Wetmore (who previously wrote the game Preppie!) for Star Systems Software, Inc. The Commodore 128 version was ported by Sean M. Puckett and Scott S. Smith.

The Atari 8-bit version of HomePak is implemented in the Action! programming language from Optimized Systems Software.

== Reception ==
Ahoy! warned "don't expect more than you pay for", stating that while HomeText was "quite nice" and HomeTerm was "wonderful," HomeFile was "very disappointing. Anyone who needs to use the database for even a mildly sophisticated operation will be frustrated and confused ... a total mess".

In a review of the HomeTerm portion of the package, Ron Luks wrote in a 1984 review for ANALOG Computing, "A superb terminal program is rare indeed, but in my collection of over two dozen Atari terminal programs, I have two or three that meet the "superb" criteria. Only one, however, can be the best. Hometerm is, quite simply, the best."

In a 1986 Page 6 review, the author had technical problems using HomeTerm in the UK. He called HomeFind, "elegant, friendly and very easy to use," and wrote that HomeText, "might even tempt me away from my trusty old Atariwriter."

== Legacy ==
With Sparky Starks, Wetmore co-authored a similarly styled Atari 8-bit application called HomeCard. It was advertised as an "electronic filing box" and "intelligent Rolodex." HomeCard was published by Antic Software in 1985.
