= Batteries Included =

Batteries Included may refer to:

- Batteries Included (company), a computer hardware and software company
- "Batteries Included" (song), a 1996 single by Servotron
- Motto of the Python programming language, meaning it comes with a large library of useful modules
- "Batteries included" (slang), in a product usability (mostly in software) it states that the product comes together with all possible parts required for full usability
