= Quest of the Space Beagle =

1984 video game

- Publisher: Avalon Hill Microcomputer Games
- Designer: Scott Lamb
- Platforms: Atari 8-bit, Commodore 64
- Release: 1984: Atari 8-bit 1985: C64
- Genre: Action-adventure
- Mode: Single-player

Quest of the Space Beagle is an action-adventure game written by Scott Lamb for Atari 8-bit computers and published by Avalon Hill Microcomputer Games in 1984. It is the sequel to Jupiter Mission 1999. A Commodore 64 port followed in 1985.

== Gameplay ==
Quest of the Space Beagle is a collection of minigames about the player finding and returning to Earth after a failed trip to Jupiter in the previous game.

== Development ==
Scott Lamb wrote the game in Atari BASIC.

The manual contains a note about a programming technique used to create the visuals: "One effect employs alternating graphics screens every 60th second, which considerably extends the graphics capabilities of the Atari computer. A side effect of this technique is flicker."

== Reception ==
In an Antic review, Michael Ciraolo wrote, "there is little incentive to get to the next level so the game gets boring quickly. You do the same thing again and again." He also disliked the flickering effect of the graphics. Steve Hudson wrote in Compute!: "The game's programmers have used some pretty fancy techniques to jazz up an already exciting game," and called one screen "an incredibly realistic display".
