= Boulders and Bombs =

1983 video game

- Developer: K-Byte
- Publisher: CBS Software
- Designers: Keith Dreyer; Torre Meeder
- Platform: Atari 8-bit
- Release: 1983
- Genre: Action
- Modes: Single-player, asymmetric multiplayer

Boulders and Bombs is a video game for Atari 8-bit computers published on cartridge by CBS Software in 1983. It was written by Keith Dreyer and Torre Meeder who previously developed the Berzerk-clone K-Razy Shoot-Out. In Boulders and Bombs, the player must dig tunnels so three people can cross from one side of the screen to the other. Bird-like creatures, flying in the upper portion of the screen, launch projectiles into the dirt to thwart the player. While there isn't a separate multiplayer mode, joysticks plugged into each of the remaining 1-3 ports can each control one of the birds. The game generally received poor reviews, with reviewers citing control issues and the lack of excitement.

== Gameplay ==
The player in a clear tunnel, below one filled with green fungus.

Presented in a side-view, roughly 40% of the vertical screen is dirt and above that, sky. The dirt extends downward through the non-playable area where the score and other information are displayed.

The player controls both an auger—which digs tunnels when moved through dirt—and a spelunker who can only move through clear tunnels. The joystick button switches between control of the auger and spelunker. Boulders slow the auger's drilling. The goal is to clear a path so the spelunker, who starts on the left side of the screen, can exit the right side, then repeat the process for two more spelunkers. All three must be freed over the course of one animated day/night cycle.

The sky is occupied by large and small birds, called alien bird creatures and alien probe birds in the manual. The large birds drop rods which block tunnels. The small birds inject a fungus into the ground which spreads and is deadly to spelunkers. Both obstacles can be cleared with the auger.

When controlling the spelunker, moving the joystick in a circle drops a bomb which removes dirt, rods, and fungus. The probe birds can be killed if an exploding bomb hits the fungus injector before the injection process is complete.

=== Multiplayer ===
From 1 to 3 other players (depending on the number of joystick ports) can control probe birds, affecting the primary player's game. This can be done at any time without enabling a specific mode.

== Reception ==
In a 2 out of 4 joystick review for Electronic Fun with Computers & Games, Paul Backer complained of the difficulty in planting bombs with a circular joystick motion and also pointed out that a secondary player can easily finish off a spelunker by planting fungus directly in front of it. He concluded, "This is a sound premise upon which to build a game. Unfortunately, the designers failed to provide an exciting challenge."

The Addison-Wesley Book of Atari Software 1984 gave the game a "D" rating: "The game just isn't exciting and can become frustrating, and I think most players will lose interest quickly." In a 1989 retrospective of Atari 8-bit computer software in ANALOG Computing, Arthur Leyenberger wrote, "Boulders and Bombs was another CBS disappointment. It was difficult to play, uninteresting, and not challenging."

== See also ==
- Chopper Hunt
