= Cyber Studio =

3D modeling and animation package

Cyber Studio CAD-3D
- Original author: Tom Hudson
- Developer: Antic Software
- Initial release: 1986; 40 years ago
- Stable release: 2.02 / 1987; 39 years ago
- Operating system: Atari TOS
- Type: 3D computer graphics
- License: Proprietary

Cyber Studio CAD-3D (or just CAD-3D) is a 3D modeling and animation package developed by Tom Hudson for the Atari ST computer and published by Antic Software. The package is a precursor to 3D Studio Max.

CAD-3D is a basic polygonal 3D modeling and rendering program. An operator can assemble a scene out of geometric primitives or custom extruded or lathed objects. Various view ports are available to adjust lighting and camera positioning. The limited rendering functionality allows for flat shading in 16 shades. Rendered images can be exported in Degas Elite or NEOChrome format.

By making changes between rendering separate cels, CAD-3D can be used for simple animations. Without its scripting extension Cyber Control changes have to be made by hand.

== History ==
The first version was published in 1986 titled CAD-3D. It still lacked advanced modeling features (boolean subtraction) and any animation.

In early 1987 Tom Hudson extended the application and it was renamed 'Cyber Studio CAD-3D v.2.02 '. The name Cyber Studio was proposed by Antic Software publisher Gary Yost due to his interest in William Gibson's seminal 1984 book Neuromancer which had introduced the term Cyberspace to describe a virtual 3D environment. As of 1987 the software was packaged together with Cybermate, a Forth-based authoring language written by Tektronix engineer Mark Kimball, the creator of the StereoTek liquid crystal shutter 3D glasses that Antic Software sold as an add-on to Cyber Studio. Cybermate was used to edit, sequence and present the animation files along with sound. The scripts allowed an operator to control when and how fast a video or audio segment played and whether it should loop. In combination with the other scripting language, CyberControl, users were capable to create video animations up to five minutes long. Jim Kent wrote Cyber Paint, a 2D animation program that brought together a wide variety of animation and paint functionality and the delta-compressed animation format developed for CAD-3D.

== Extensions ==
Antic Software published a variety of related Cyber-products to extend the software's functionality:

- Cyberpaint - A Cell-based 2D-painting and animation software
- CyberControl - Scripting language for CyberStudio CAD-3D
- CyberSculpt - An extended modeling software
- CyberTexture - A texturing extension
