= The Hangmen (Washington, D.C. band) =

American rock band

Background information
- Origin: Rockville, Maryland, and Monument, Maryland, Washington, D.C., United States
- Genres: Proto-punk; garage rock; psychedelic
- Years active: 1964-1967
- Label: Monument
- Past members: Dave Ottley; Tom Guernsey; George Daly; Mike West; Paul Dowell; Bob Berberich

The Hangmen were an American rock band from Rockville, Maryland, who were active in the 1960s. In an effort to distinguish themselves from other American groups and establish a closer affiliation with the popular British Invasion, they lured Scottish vocalist Dave Ottley to join the group. Eventually they became the most popular band in the Washington, D.C., area, having a huge regional hit with "What a Girl Can't Do", that appeared on Monument Records, but was recorded by an earlier local group, the Reekers, whose membership included two future Hangmen, Tom Guernsey and Bob Berberich. The single was nonetheless credited to the Hangmen.

The song became so popular in the region in that on one occasion the band was greeted with near "Beatlemanic" adoration from fans, whose enthusiasm on one occasion erupted into a near riot. The group followed-up with the single "Faces", which featured a more aggressive sound. Ottley shortly thereafter departed from the band and was replaced by Tony Taylor.

Now with Taylor, the group traveled to Nashville to record the album Bittersweet, which displayed a more eclectic and relaxed approach, despite its closing song, a raucous version of Van Morrison's' Gloria". The album's opening cut, a sitar-embellished version of "Dream Baby", was simultaneously released as a single. After subsequent lineup changes, the Hangmen changed their name to the Button. As the Button, they taped an unreleased set of songs for RCA Records in New York, but changed their name to Graffiti and recorded briefly for ABC Records.

== History ==
=== Origins ===
The Hangmen were founded in 1964 by bassist Mike West and rhythm guitarist George Daly at Montgomery Junior College in Rockville, Maryland. In 1965 they recruited fellow Montgomery students guitarist Tom Guernsey and drummer Bob Berberich previously from a band called the Reekers, who were on indefinite hold after two members Joe Triplett and Mike Henley departed for college. Guernsey, who had been the Reekers' leader and principal songwriter, was reluctant at first to leave his former band for The Hangmen, but later changed his mind and joined. The Hangmen now needed a vocalist and, wishing to project an image that would be in line with the British Invasion, guitarist George Daly contacted the British Embassy asking for a British singer. He was first referred to a female vocalist, but she, in turn, introduced the group to Dave Ottley, a hairdresser for Vincent Hair Stylists, who had been in the United States for two years. Ottley was from Glasgow, Scotland, though some newspaper articles covering the band at the time suggested that he was from Liverpool, a town popularly noted for its being the hometown of The Beatles. The first news story about the band appeared in the Washington Evening Star on April 3, 1965, mentioning their appearance in a battle of the bands at the Shirlington Shopping Center in which they lost to the local band the Shadows.

=== Contract with Monument Records ===
In early summer of 1965, the Hangmen's managers, Larry Sealfon and Mike Klavens, played a track to Fred Foster of Washington, D.C.'s Monument label that had been recorded by the Reekers and written by Guernsey called "What a Girl Can't Do". The Reekers' manager Lillian Claiborne released Guernsey from his former band's contract, and Foster signed him. Monument released the Reekers’ recording of "What a Girl Can't Do", as well as "The Girl Who Faded Away", which is also generally understood to be recorded by the Reekers, both under the Hangmen's name. Though some accounts attribute the recording of "The Girl Who Faded Away" to the Hangmen, Chris Bishop of Garage Hangover asserts that those viewpoints are likely mistaken—pointing out that the released version of the song is likely the same recorded performance as the Reekers' acetate that was earlier recorded at Rodel Studio in Georgetown, but with only a shorter faded-out ending on the Hangmen's release (in 1966 the Hangmen recorded a substantially different version of the song for their LP, Bittersweet). Under the assumption that both recordings preceded the Hangmen, Guernsey and Berberich were the only two members of the Reekers that played on the cuts as the Edgewood sessions were done after Triplett and Henley left that group.

In 1965 Arnold Stahl, a local an attorney, and Mike Klavans of WTTG formed 427 Enterprises and took over as the band's management team, helping to further promote the Hangmen. Their connections landed gigs for the group in embassies and even attracted a mention of the group in Newsweek. At the request of Ethel Kennedy, they played at a party for Robert F. Kennedy's family while they were still living at Hickory Hill in McLean, Virginia, and Tom Guernsey recounts that he and several other members of the band drank heavily and became inebriated that night. Despite these connections, the Hangmen remained primarily a suburban band, playing for young people at parties and at shopping malls. The group had not yet matriculated to the club scene in Washington, D.C., frequented by other acts such as the British Walkers and the Chartbusters. As "What a Girl Can't Do" climbed up the local charts, this situation changed. Eventually, the song reached #1 on the local charts, and the Hangmen became the most popular group in Washington DC.

=== Regional success ===
Their precipitous rise in local popularly did not come without its share of notoriety. The February 19, 1966, edition of Billboard reported a "Beatlemania"-style incident that took place at the Giant Record Shop in Falls Church, Virginia, in which a crowd of teenagers convened to hear the Hangmen play a show there, but after the first fifteen minutes of the performance, police had to disperse the excessively large queue, which had caused a traffic jam outside, in fear of possible violations to fire codes. The band was instructed to stop playing and they were whisked into a nearby patrol car and escorted away from the scene. A near riot erupted. In the ensuing melee, angry fans smashed browser bins and display cases. Jack Shaver, the store's owner told Billboard that the store sold 2,500 copies "What a Girl Can't Do". According to Shaver, a nearby high school was let out that day because of snow, and that the store began filling up at noon in anticipation of the scheduled 4 p.m. performance. He estimated that approximately 400 were "jammed and packed" inside, and that as many as 1,500 were clustered outside pressing to get in. Tom Guernsey has recollected that there were up to 500 in the store and 300 outside. Shaver, who did not have insurance to cover the damage costs, went on to comment in Billboard that he previously let well-known stars such as Johnny Rivers, Johnny Tillotson, Peter and Gordon, and Ramsey Lewis perform at his store, but "...they never created anything like this."

By February 1966, "What a Girl Can't Do" displaced the Beatles' "We Can Work It Out" b/w "Day Tripper" from the top slot on Arlington's WEAM charts. However, Monument records did not promote "What a Girl Can't Do" beyond the Washington, D.C., area, so the song failed to catch on nationally, although anticipations were high. In late 1966 Guernsey made a decision to quit college, when a scheduled performance on the Jerry Blavat TV show coincided with his final exams. On the show, the Hangmen played "What a Girl Can't Do" and later came on to back the Impressions in their version of Berry Gordy and Janie Bradford's "Money"; Jerry Butler also appeared on the show. The Hangmen played up and down the East coast from New York to Florida. They opened for the Animals, Martha Reeves, the Yardbirds, Count Five, the Dave Clark Five, as well as the Shangri-Las. Guernsey recalls Link Wray borrowing a guitar and coming up on stage to join the Hangmen during one of their shows, launching into a long version of Jack the Ripper. On May 8, 1966, the Hangmen were profiled in the Sunday magazine of the Washington Evening Star. The Hangmen landed a deal to endorse Mosrite guitars and amplifiers even though, according to Guernsey, they preferred using other brands.

Mike West left the band and was replaced by the mustachioed Paul Dowell. The Hangmen then proceeded to recorded a more aggressive sounding follow-up single, "Faces", produced by Fred Foster, which featured a sneering vocal from Ottley and a razor-like fuzz guitar riff, backed with "Bad Goodbye", in which noted session musician Charlie McCoy made a cameo appearance on harmonica. This time around, Monument put a sizable investment into the song's promotion, even taking out full page ads in various national trade magazines.

=== Bittersweet LP ===
After the single's release, lead singer Ottley moved to London and was replaced by Tony Taylor. In late 1966, the Hangmen went to Monument Studios in Nashville to record their album Bittersweet produced by Buzz Cason. According to Guernsey:

Buzz was very methodical and hands on. He had us demo up all the possible songs for the album in a smaller studio in Nashville with him and we experimented with various things—chords, bridges, harmonies, different instruments, etc. Then we took the best songs in to Monuments mains studios and recorded them. It still amazes me that we did the album on a three-track machine! At any rate, we cranked the tunes out in a couple of weeks and that was it.

The album included noticeably more low-key renditions of "What a Girl Can't Do" and "Faces". Monument convinced the group to do a sitar and fuzz-laden version of "Dream Baby", which would appear as the A-side of their November 1966 single and on the ensuing album. The Bittersweet album showed a gentler and more folk-influenced side of the band, as they were beginning to explore more eclectic stylings in-keeping with the psychedelic mood of the. However, the album ends with one of the more raucous versions of Van Morrison's oft-recorded garage-anthem "Gloria". Guernsey feels that they group could have made a better album, admitting that they did not take the album or Nashville seriously enough. According to Guernsey, "I think we spent more time in Nashville bars than the studio. Oh well, it was fun." Bittersweet came adorned with an eerie front cover photograph of the band taken at Tom Guernsey's apartment.

=== Later configurations and post-history ===
Paul Dowell and George Daly left the group and Dowell was replaced Alan Flower, previously the bassist for the Mad Hatters, and George Strunz replaced Daly. The May 17, 1967, edition of the Star Ledger reported that the Hangmen had changed their name to the Button and would further pursue a psychedelic direction. By June 1967, Tom Guernsey had left the band and was replaced by John Sears. The Button re-located to New York and recorded an unreleased session for RCA and played at Steve Paul's club the Scene on West 46th Street and at the Cafe Au Go Go on Bleeker. Bob Berberich departed soon after, leaving Tony Taylor as the only remaining member of the Hangmen still in the group. Once again the band changed its name—this time to Graffiti, and signed and recorded with ABC.

Tom Guernsey produced a single for the Washington, D.C., band the Piece Kor, featuring the song, "All I Want Is My Baby". He also wrote, produced and played on a single by a band from Montgomery County, the Omegas, "I Can't Believe", where he played guitar and piano. Guernsey produced records for several United Artists acts, as well as for artists on other labels. He later persuaded a career writing and scoring for advertising and television and worked on projects for TK Records out of Florida, which included involvement with K.C. and the Sunshine Band and other R&B acts. Bob Berberich joined George Daly and Paul Dowell in Dolphin, Nils Lofgren's group. Berberich stayed with Lofgren, playing in Grin, while Paul Dowell became equipment manager for Jefferson Airplane. George Daly went on to become a music executive and A&R-man with Elektra Records.

Tom Guernsey (born on July 5, 1944, in Chicago) died on October 3, 2012, in Portland, Oregon, at age 68.

Two months later, David Ottley passed on November 27, 2012.

== Membership ==
=== Early- to mid-1965 ===
- Dave Ottley (lead vocals)
- Tom Guernsey (lead guitar, backing vocals)
- George Daly (rhythm guitar)
- Mike West (bass)
- Paul Dowell (bass)
- Bob Berberich (drums)

=== Mid-1965 to mid-1966 ===
- Dave Ottley (lead vocals)
- Tom Guernsey (lead guitar, backing vocals)
- George Daly (rhythm guitar)
- Mike West (bass)
- Paul Dowell (bass)
- Bob Berberich (drums)

=== Late 1966 to mid-1967 ===
- Tony Taylor (lead vocals)
- Tom Guernsey (lead guitar, backing vocals)
- George Daly (rhythm guitar)
- Paul Dowell (bass)
- Bob Berberich (drums)

=== Mid-1966 to late 1967 ===
- Tony Taylor (lead vocals)
- George Daly (rhythm guitar)
- George Strunz (guitar)
- Alan Flower (bass)
- Bob Berberich (drums)

== Discography ==
=== Singles ===
- "What a Girl Can't Do" b/w "The Girl Who Faded Away" (Monument 910, November 1965)
- "Faces" b/w "Bad Goodbye" (Monument 951, June 1966)
- "Dream Baby" b/w "Let It Be Me" (Monument 983, November 1966)

=== Long playing ===
- Bittersweet (Monument SLP 18077, 1967)
