= Jupiter Mission 1999 =

1983 video game

- Publisher: Avalon Hill Microcomputer Games
- Designer: Scott Lamb
- Platforms: Atari 8-bit, Commodore 64
- Release: 1983
- Genre: Action-adventure
- Mode: Single-player

Jupiter Mission 1999 is an action-adventure game written by Scott Lamb for the Atari 8-bit computers and published by Avalon Hill Microcomputer Games in 1983. The game shipped on four floppy disks. It was followed by a sequel in 1984, Quest of the Space Beagle.

== Gameplay ==
Jupiter Mission 1999 is an adventure game in which the government chooses the player to pilot a spaceship to Jupiter. The game consists of 11 interrelated mini-games.

== Reception ==
Mark Bausman, in a review for Computer Gaming World, wrote, "All eleven games have been tied together nicely to present a coherent adventure." Bausman disliked the amount of time spent waiting for parts of the game to load, but concluded "from the standpoint of overall playability, I would have to say that this is the best adventure game I have seen in a long time." Bill Wallace reviewed Jupiter Mission 1999 in Space Gamer No. 70, writing "If Jupiter moon trivia is your thing, or if you enjoy clunky Basic games, you should own Jupiter Mission 1999." Scott Mace of InfoWorld wrote, "What Jupiter Mission lacks in characterization, it makes up for in action, strategy, and the sheer panorama of the game". He also commented on the difficulty of the space navigation. InfoWorld's Essential Guide to Atari Computers recommended the game as among the best simulations for the Atari 8-bit, stating that some would find it too complex but "this game will go a long way".
