= Preppie! =

1982 video game

- Cover art by Scott Ross
- Developer: Star Systems Software
- Publishers: Adventure International; Americana (UK)
- Designer: Russ Wetmore
- Platform: Atari 8-bit
- Release: NA: 1982; EU: 1986
- Genre: Action

Preppie! is an action video game for Atari 8-bit computers published by Adventure International in 1982. It was programmed by Russ Wetmore of Star Systems Software, whose name is prominently on the box cover. Leaning on the preppy trend of the early 1980s, the game follows prep schooler Wadsworth Overcash as he navigates the hazards of a country club to retrieve golf balls. Preppie! borrows heavily from Konami's Frogger, with lanes of traffic in the bottom half of the screen and a river crossing the top portion. Alligators are an element from both Frogger and preppy fashion; an open-mouthed gator is the icon of shirt brand Izod. Reviewers recognized the game as derivative, but called the music and visuals some of the best for Atari 8-bit computers.

Preppie! was followed by a maze game, Preppie! II, from the same author in 1983. A third game in the series was mentioned in a 1983 interview, but never materialized. In 2016, Russ Wetmore released the source code for both Preppie! games.

== Gameplay ==
Wadsworth between the road and river, near a golf ball.

Like Frogger, the player must cross lanes of traffic, then jump between floating objects to reach the other side of a river. The frog is recast as a preppy, and the setting moved to a country club where traffic consists of golf carts and reel mower-pushing groundskeepers. Canoes, logs, and alligators occupy the water.

Instead of simply getting to the other side as in Frogger, the goal is to retrieve all of the golf balls and return them to the bottom of the screen. Each ball requires a separate trip. The golf balls appear either in the strip between the two areas or on the far side of the river.

There are ten levels. A bonus preppie is given for reaching 8,000 points.

== Development ==
Programmer Russ Wetmore worked for Adventure International in a developer support role. He borrowed an Atari 800 from founder Scott Adams with the intent of writing a video game. Wetmore's then-spouse, Diana, suggested a "cartoonish" style of game. Wetmore took inspiration from the preppy fad spawned by 1980's The Official Preppy Handbook. He wrote the game on in eight weeks using the Atari Macro Assembler. Being more familiar with Z80 assembly language from programming the TRS-80, he used macros to give a Z80 flavor to 6502 code.

Like Frogger, the music consists of multiple short pieces strung together. These include an arrangement of Humoresque Op. 101 No. 7 by Antonín Dvořák and "The Fountain in the Park".

== Reception ==
In a 1982 review for Antic, Robert DeWitt concluded "Al has a real winner here, even if the 'cover' concept is only remotely related to the game." Bill Kunkel of Electronic Games called it a "Frogger-inspired delight." He clarified: "Sure it sounds familiar, but what elevates Preppie! from the score of Frogger-clones on the software market is the enchanting four-part harmony sound effects and the stunning graphics."

John J. Anderson of Creative Computing Video & Arcade Games stated that although gameplay is not original "the implementation is gorgeous." A COMPUTE! review also lauded the graphics and stated, "this program easily ranks among the best games to appear for the Atari computer to date." The Book of Atari Software 1983 gave a rating of B-minus, writing "Animation and graphics are very good" and "I can't say it's very original in design; but, like Frogger, it is lots of fun."

In an "Antic Pix Ten" article, Antic chose Preppie! as "among the most popular, interesting, and valuable programs yet written for your amusement." In the January 1983 issue of Joystik, David and Sandy Small included Preppie! on a similar list of their ten "most heavily played, and most recommended, games."

== Legacy ==
Preppie! was followed by Preppie! II in 1983, also by Wetmore. The sequel is an abstract maze video game with a goal of painting all of the corridors pink by moving through them. Elements of the original return as obstacles, including giant frogs, golf carts, and lawn mowers.

Wetmore mentioned a possible third game in the series when interviewed by Electronic Games in 1983, giving the tentative title as Preppies in Space. He was asked about this in 2005, and his response was posted to the AtariAge forums:

Some conceptual work was done on Preppie 3, but nothing ever came of it. When I was interviewed for Electronic Games (the only place I ever mentioned P3) I was in New York for an awards ceremony and had just come from a brainstorming session to come up with some talking points for the press. The interview was more to generate buzz than to promote future products, and when the bottom fell out of the games market in the coming months, I gave up game writing to focus on other types of software, notably HomePak.

== See also ==
- Pacific Coast Highway (1982)
