= Sea Dragon (video game) =

1982 video game

- Publisher: Adventure International
- Designers: Wayne Westmoreland; Terry Gilman
- Programmers: TRS-80; Wayne Westmoreland; Terry Gilman; Apple II; John Anderson; Atari 8-bit Russ Wetmore; Commodore 64; David H. Simmons; Tandy CoCo; Jim Hurd; IBM PC; Hervé Thouzard
- Platforms: Apple II, Atari 8-bit, Commodore 64, MS-DOS, TRS-80, TRS-80 Color Computer
- Release: 1982: TRS-80, Apple, Atari; 1983: CoCo, IBM PC; 1984: C64
- Genre: Scrolling shooter
- Mode: Single-player

Sea Dragon is a horizontally scrolling shooter for the TRS-80 computer written by Wayne Westmoreland and Terry Gilman and released in 1982 by Adventure International. The gameplay is similar to the Scramble arcade video game, but underwater. It was ported to the Apple II, Atari 8-bit computers, Commodore 64, TRS-80 Color Computer, and MS-DOS. The TRS-80 and Apple II show the scenery as outlines, while the other versions use filled color graphics. The Apple and Color Computer ports include digitized speech.

In 1995, Wayne Westmoreland placed the game into the public domain. In January 2016 the source code for the Atari 8-bit version was released to the public and added to the Internet Archive.

== Gameplay ==
The player's sub is heading toward a cave (Atari 8-bit).

The player controls a submarine that can shoot torpedoes both forward and upward. The gameplay involves navigating "past underwater mountains and through labyrinthine passages while avoiding webs of explosive mines that rise from the sea bottom. Additional dangers include mine-dropping ships, enemy attack stations, falling stalactites, and deadly lasers—any of which could keep you from your ultimate goal: destruction of the incredibly powerful nuclear reactor at the end of the undersea course." (Adventure International catalog, 1982)

=== Speech ===
The Apple II version uses digitized voice that says "Sea Dragon!" When the user starts the game, he or she is told, "Good day, captain! Your ship's computer is now ready. Please wait while I initialize systems!", and during the game will be informed, "Air level critical!", "Checkpoint!", and "Approaching maximum damage!" The use of speech was a novelty, as the Apple II speaker is only able to emit a one-bit click. Programming Sea Dragon to play back an audio sample is a technical achievement shared with Castle Wolfenstein (1981), Dung Beetles (1982), Creepy Corridors (1982), and Plasmania (1982).

The Color Computer version is the only other version that includes speech. It says "Welcome aboard, Captain!" on the title screen.

== Reception ==
Atari 8-bit title screen

Writing for Video magazine in 1983, Ivan Berger noted that Sea Dragon's graphics were dominated by "simple patterns and primary colors". This Berger contrasted with the "more subtle colors and shadings that go into professional animation", however Berger noted that while Sea Dragon was emblematic in this regard, the chromatic and graphical simplicity of the game was endemic to the home computer game medium.
