= Chop Suey (1985 video game) =

1985 video game

- Publishers: English Software; Antic Software (US)
- Designer: Adam Billyard
- Platform: Atari 8-bit
- Release: 1985
- Genre: Fighting

Chop Suey is a martial arts fighting game developed by Adam Billyard for the Atari 8-bit computers. It was published in 1985 by English Software. Antic Software published the game in the US. The title is a repurposing of American Chinese cuisine dish of the same name.

== Gameplay ==
Gameplay screenshot

Chop Suey is a one-on-one martial arts fighting game. The action takes place on a box-type stage, watched by an audience sitting in several rows of seats in front of two competitors. Each successful attack on an opponent means their pain bar goes up and when the bar is full, the POW symbol will start blinking. It means the player is in a very fragile state of health - one more punch or kick and the fighter will fall. The match ends when the fighter falls eight times or the timer runs out. At the top of each wall air vents will open occasionally, allowing scorpions to drop to the floor and scuttle away. The players should avoid them at all costs, as they give potentially lethal bites.

If the player is victorious, a more difficult opponent is faced in the next match.

== Development ==
Adam Billyard wrote some routines to draw large bitmapped sprites, and he wanted to use them in a game. He was at college at the time, and got so absorbed into writing Chop Suey that he missed his end of the year exams and was expelled. Billyard later graduated and completed a doctorate.

Chop Suey uses a variation of Johann Sebastian Bach's Brandenburg Concerto No. 3 as its title music.

== Reception ==
Jim Short was impressed with Chop Suey in his review for Page 6 magazine. He concluded: "English Software are onto a winner here. [...] Graphics and animation are first-rate and, perhaps more importantly, it's an easy and fun game to play. Well done, English Software!"
