= George Daly (music executive) =

American music executive

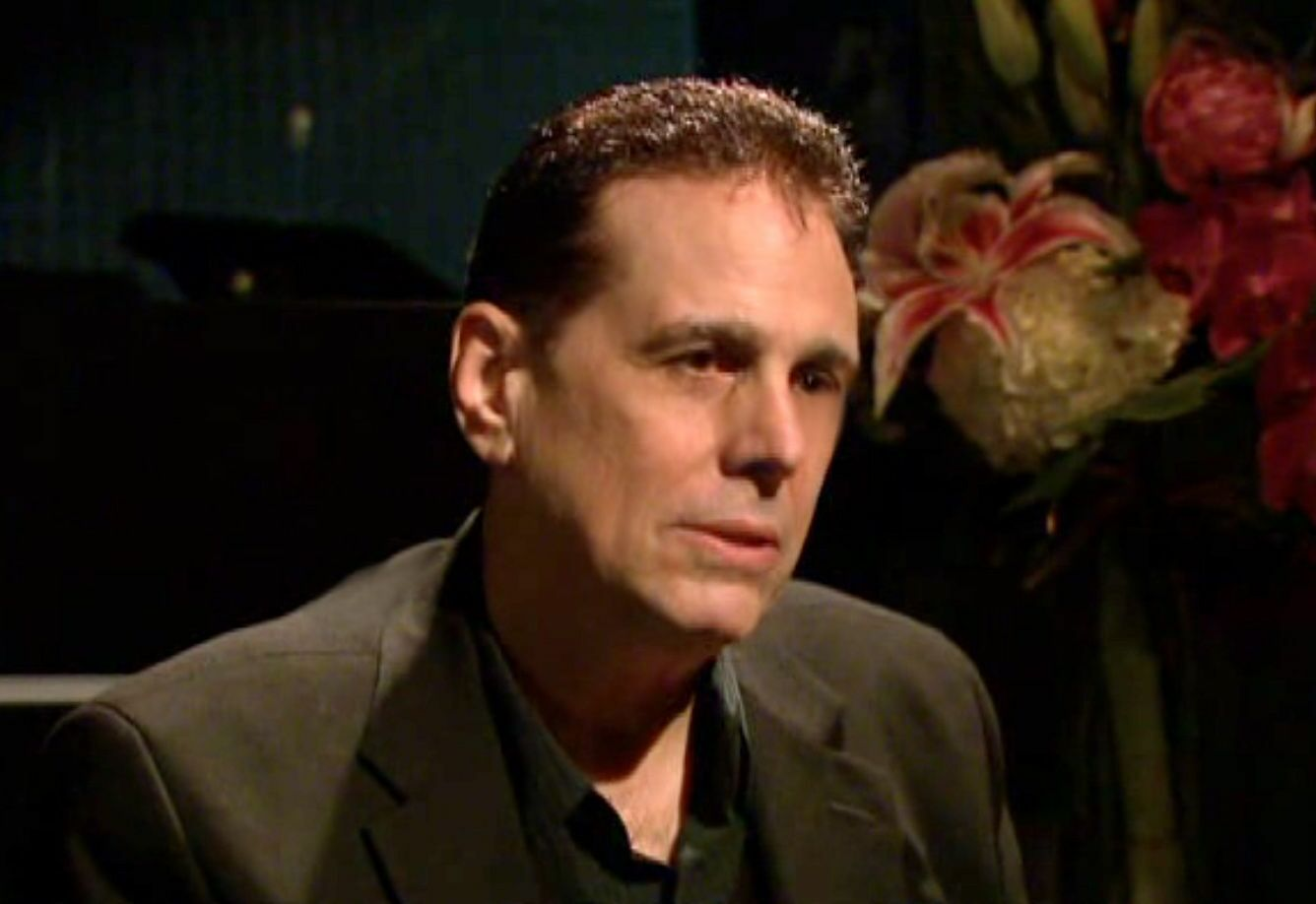

Background information
- Born: George William Daly; Annapolis, Maryland, U.S.
- Genres: Rock, folk, pop, new wave, jazz
- Occupation: Music executive
- Instruments: Guitar, piano, synthesizer, Fender bass
- Labels: Columbia, Elektra/Asylum/WMG, Atlantic/WMG, BMG/Zoo, About/UMG,

George Daly is a music executive, songwriter, musician, film and music producer, award-winning film director and technologist-inventor. In his role as a music industry Artists & Repertoire executive, he worked with Janis Joplin, Booker T. Jones, The Cars, Tool, Huey Lewis, Carlos Santana, The Rolling Stones, and others. Artists to whose efforts Daly has contributed have sold in excess of 300 million singles and albums in vinyl, tape, CD, and digital music streaming formats. Daly is also noted as a pioneer of on-demand digital video and music streaming technology.

After moving from the Washington metropolitan area to San Francisco, Daly befriended Janis Joplin and was soon hired by Columbia Records as CBS Corporate San Francisco Head of A&R spanning the Clive Davis and Goddard Lieberson eras. Following that, Daly was named head of A&R at Elektra/Asylum Records in Hollywood and later in Los Angeles, where he was hired as Head of Artist & Repertoire by Ahmet Ertegun at Atlantic Records (WMG), where he worked under Doug Morris. He then worked with Zoo Entertainment (Bertelsmann Music Group) as both BMG corporate Vice President and head of the Artists & Repertoire division. Daly is the recipient of multiple Gold Record and Platinum Record music recording certifications.

Daly discovered and contracted musical artists such as The Cars, signing the band to a long-term Elektra/Asylum recording contract on a paper napkin after a live performance at Harvard University. The band's self-titled first album stayed on the charts for 139 weeks and sold over six million copies in the US alone. Daly also discovered and brought The Tubes, a surreal SF theatrical rock band, to A&M Records. Daly also signed Bill Manspeaker's Green Jellÿ to BMG/Zoo, then Green Jelly members Maynard James Keenan and Danny Carey formed the band Tool on his label. Daly has also worked professionally as a songwriter/musician with many other prominent artists and musicians, such as Roy Buchanan, Nils Lofgren and Boz Scaggs. Daly co-wrote Boz Scaggs' classic "Slow Dancer" (also recorded by Rita Coolidge and Emmylou Harris) which some consider to be Scaggs' greatest musical achievement. Daly has also worked with other artists, including Huey Lewis, Carlos Santana, and Alice Coltrane. Daly also worked with the family of Jimi Hendrix in producing The River of Color and Sound, an award-winning interactive multimedia biography of Carlos Santana.

== Technology, patents, and inventions ==
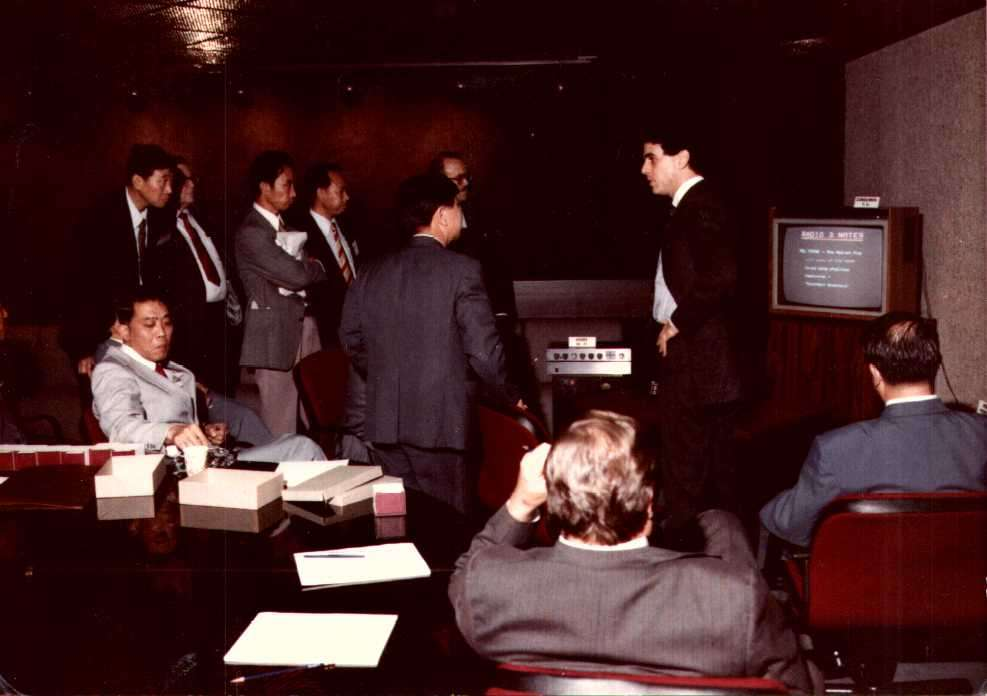
George explaining to a delegation of Chinese engineers visiting COMSAT his original concept of streaming, on-demand, downloadable music and video.

Daly holds eight US patents for audio and musical devices and is inventor of various audio devices including the early electrical guitar processor, the "Moan Tone", which was used by Nils Lofgren and others in live performance and recording and the "Master Mount" recording studio device, (later sold to RadioShack / Tandy Corp). Daly has consulted to the US Government's COMSAT STC Satellite Television Corporation, where he conceived of digital music streaming and invented the PSR2000, the first prototype desktop consumer unit demonstrating on-demand streaming digital music and video downloads:

What if, in 1984—before the internet, before streaming, before even the personal computer became commonplace—someone had already figured out how music would one day be delivered directly to consumers, on demand, without physical media? ... George conceptualized and developed and built a fully interactive simulation of a satellite-based audio and video distribution system. ... Users could navigate it, interact with it, and experience something that, for all practical purposes, did not yet exist—on-demand access to unlimited music and video. This was years before Napster, iTunes, or Spotify. Years before the iPod. Years before streaming became the global, dominant model. What George Daly did was not simply predict the future. He made it real—early enough that others could feel it. - Thomas S. Oberlin, Comcast Executive.

== Music industry ==
Clive Davis greets George Daly at the Clive Davis Pre-Grammy Gala Party for the Grammy Awards

As head of the A&R divisions at the four largest American Record corporations, Daly has overseen hundreds of artists, including their signings and album productions, including multi-platinum artists such as Janis Joplin, the Cars, Carlos Santana, Tool, Boz Scaggs, Green Jellÿ, and others. Daly has also recorded The Rolling Stones on tour, as well as Huey Lewis (in Clover, Summers Here/Pyramid Records); Gene Clark; Marc V (Too True/Elektra Records); Family Brown (Imaginary World/United Artists Records); Grammy-nominated English composer Michael Hoppé (Simple Pleasures/Seventh Wave); Pamela Polland (Pamela Polland/Columbia Records); Boulder (Boulder, Elektra Records); Alejandro Escovedo in the early punk/new wave band The Nuns, with Jennifer Miro; Blue Train (Blue Train, All I Want Is You/BMG) which gave Bertelsmann/BMG/Zoo its first pop Top 40 US Billboard hit; Laura Allan, the singer often cited as the most important inspiration to Joni Mitchell in her Blue and post-Blue vocal style; Booker T. Jones (Bittersweet/Epic Records); Skinny Songs for Heidi Roizen; Mill Valley's Tim Hockenberry, (Back In Your Arms/About Records/Universal Music Group); Larkin Gayle (Two Hands/About Records/Universal Music Group); Jon Collins, (Jon Collins/Coliseum/About Records); Boston sourced and Mill Valley discovered The Rowan Brothers, and the "sui generis" YASSOU.

At the request of Keith Richards and Rob Fraboni, Daly, starting at the 63,000-seat Oakland Coliseum went on the road with The Rolling Stones and recorded them during their Bridges To Babylon tour.

After joining Columbia Records, Daly's first role was head of A&R for the San Francisco division. Clive Davis served as Daly's mentor. At the time Columbia Records had just begun to enter the West Coast modern rock market, opening both a state-of-the art recording studio (CBS recording studio on Folsom St., San Francisco) and A&R offices at Fisherman's Wharf. Daly has been a senior executive at Divisions of four major U.S. record labels (Columbia, Elektra/Asylum/Atlantic/BMG), and is currently the CEO of About Records, a label distributed by Universal Music Group/UMG/Fontana. As an A&R executive, Daly has worked with or discovered many of the ground-breaking music acts that eventually defined their genre, including Janis Joplin, Carlos Santana, The Cars, and Tool, among others. Throughout his career he has worked directly with prominent music industry leaders such as "industry legend" Clive Davis, Ahmet Ertegun ("one of the most significant figures in the modern recording industry"), and songwriter and serial music business CEO, Doug Morris.

Daly's tenure in the music businesses' modern high-sales era coincides with the rise of the modern "tonnage" popularity of recorded music to non-physical media and global streaming music.

== Songwriting and musical performance ==
Daly founded and performed in three historically important DC bands: The Hangmen, Dolphin, and Grin. The Hangmen's performances instigated at least one 3000+ person fan riot in suburban Virginia, which was written up in Billboard magazine as one of the first of the '60's US "rock & roll riots" before the Beatles' dominance of the charts. Daly also founded the historically important DC folk-blues band, Dolphin (signed to Seymour Stein's Sire Records/London Records) The band included Daly, Bob Berberich, Paul Dowell, Nils Lofgren, and Roy Buchanan, whom Rolling Stone Magazine described as "one of the three greatest living guitarists." Daly then formed the trio Grin with fellow Hangmen alumni and drummer and friend Bob Berberich and Nils Lofgren. Daly then came to California after a chance meeting in Washington, DC between Neil Young and Nils Lofgren. Young asked Lofgren to come and bring Daly and Berberich to stay at Young's home in Laurel Canyon in the Hollywood Hills.

Lofgren worked on several Neil Young albums and would go on to join Bruce Springsteen's E Street Band. The song Slow Dancer which Daly co-wrote with Boz Scaggs went multi-platinum. Daly has also written with Roy Orbison, Cole Tate, Justin Miller, Mill Valley icon Austin de Lone, and singer/songwriter Tim Hockenberry, whom Howard Stern praised as his all-time favorite singer when Hockenberry appeared on America's Got Talent.

== Film projects, Productions and Awards ==
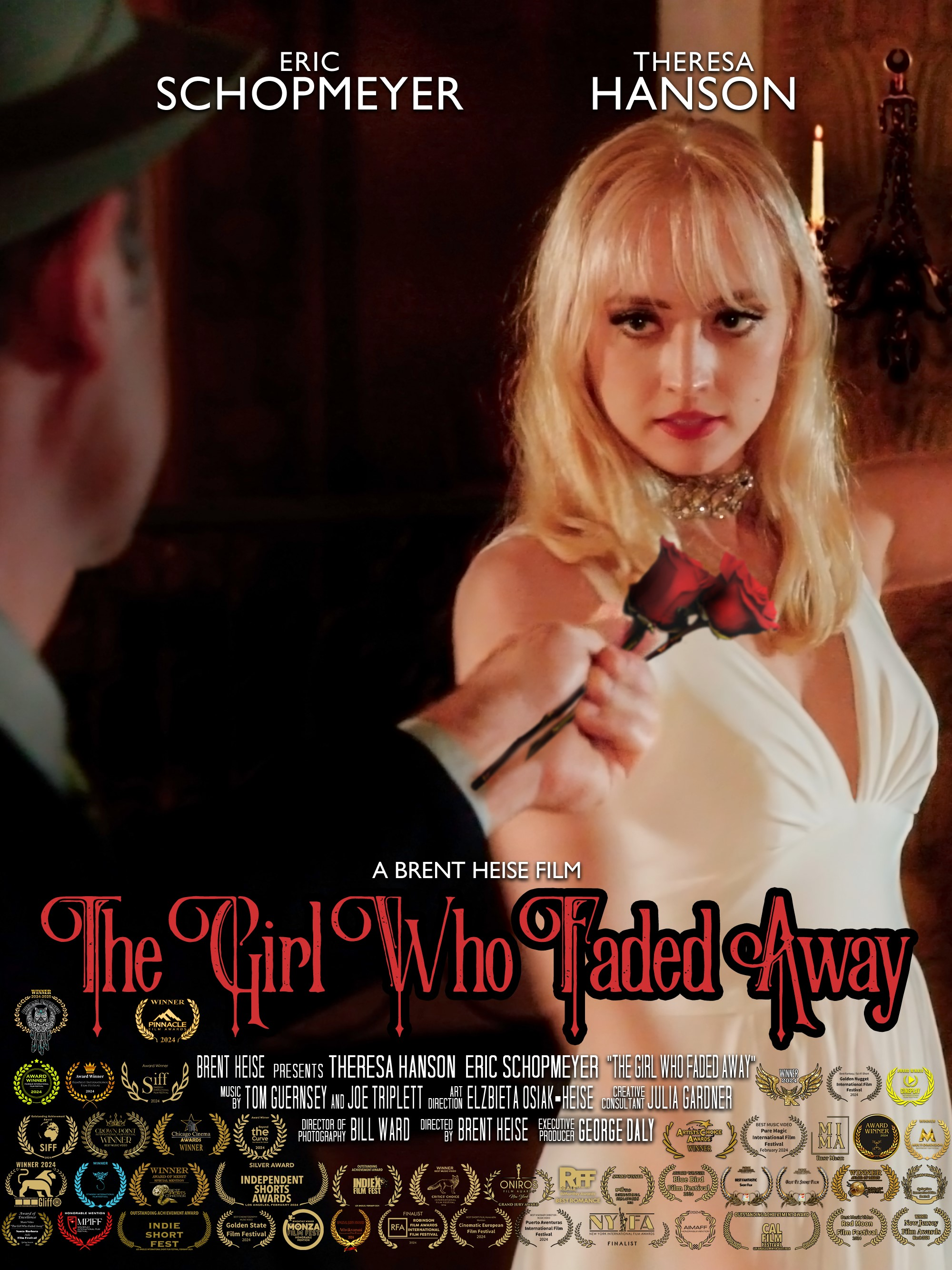
The Girl Who Faded Away, the multi-award-winning film which Daly produced and co-wrote.

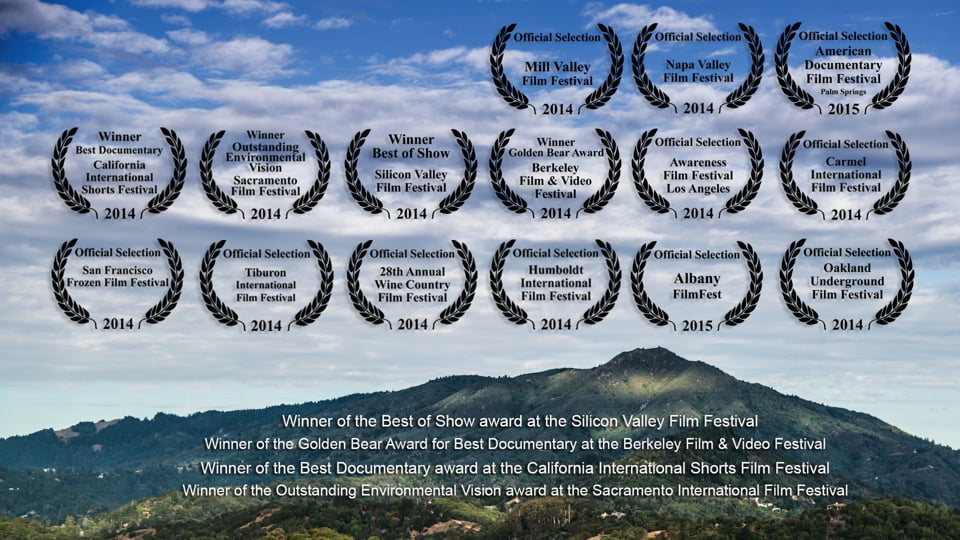
The Invisible Peak, which Daly directed alongside Gary Yost in 2014.

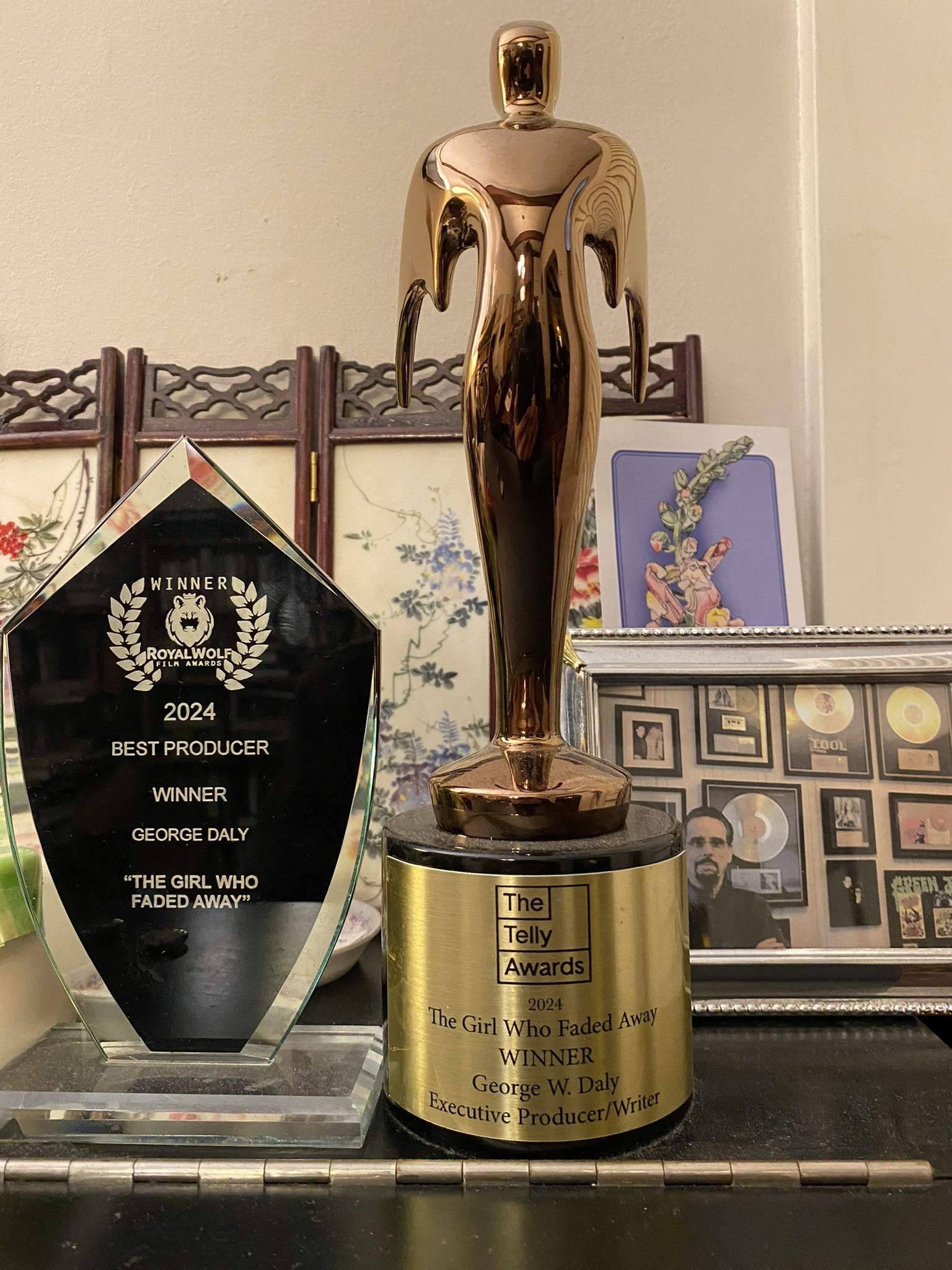
Telly Award for The Girl Who Faded Away film, co-written and produced by George Daly.

In film, Daly was the Executive Producer and Co-Writer the globally multiple-award-winning music video The Girl Who Faded Away in partnership with Portland, Oregon Director, Editor and Co-Writer Brent Heise, which debuted at Grauman's Chinese Theatre in Hollywood, CA. The music video is based on a song released by the Hangmen band and written by Tom Guernsey and vocalist Joe Triplett. The film has won over 225 Film Festival awards internationally, including several "Academy Award feeding" festivals such as the Telly Award. Alongside Gary Yost, Daly co-directed, co-wrote, and co-edited the multiple-award-winning film documentary about the restoration of Marin County's Mount Tamalpais: The Invisible Peak (narrated by actor Peter Coyote). Daly also produced all the music and sound design in the film, which includes piano performances by Michael Hoppé and multi-Emmy award-winning composer Ron Alan Cohen.

Daly wrote and produced the first digitally recorded (Soundstream system) live music video and TV series, StudioLive, which was short-listed in the Emmy's technical category. StudioLive starred Freddie Hubbard, with music composed and conducted by Allyn Ferguson. Daly also wrote, produced and served as an Executive Producer of the multimedia life story of Carlos Santana, The River of Color and Sound, for Polygram Multimedia. Daly and Colin Farish created the pilot television show Sanctuary of Sound, with Daly on-screen and in discussion with such music business notables as Narada Michael Walden and Ben Fong-Torres.

While serving as a consultant to the Smithsonian Institution's National Museum of American History, Daly produced the music accompanying the exhibit of the original Star Spangled Banner, arranging a performance of the national anthem with period-accurate instruments. Daly recorded and produced the unique rendition of Francis Scott Key's composition using a modern studio orchestra playing the original instruments from the mid-19th century. Daly acquired the rare instruments with the help of Dr. Arthur Molella, then Chairman of the museum's department of the History of Science and Technology at the Smithsonian Institution. Additionally, Daly developed a computerized performance to accompany the musical score. The Star-Spangled Banner is the most popular Smithsonian exhibit of all time.

To give back to youth in music, Daly co-founded the Teen Hoot with Nashville producer/songwriter Hall-of-Famer David Malloy. The Teen Hoot, using live and streamed music performances with a growing, large online community propelled by video, YouTube, Instagram, Facebook and Twitter (where the Hoot has trended Twitter top three in the world), encourages young singers and songwriters to learn their craft. Hoot's one voting event garnered over 1,300,000 votes from online fans.

Daly also identified and coordinated the acquisition of 65 million streaming song licenses as well as the design of the UFC's Ultimate Sound, one of the first corporate branded streaming music services.

The 2026 Milley Award winner, George Daly for musical arts.

The Milley Awards, an annual Mill Valley recognition program for creative achievement, will celebrate its 35th year in 2026. Recipients are selected annually by a rotating panel of local judges. Musician, songwriter, and music producer George Daly has worked across music performance, songwriting, production, and music technology. He has lived and worked in Mill Valley for approximately five decades and has been involved in the area's music community.

Daly has collaborated with and supported local musicians including Marty Balin, Huey Lewis, the Rowan Brothers, and Austin de Lone. His work has also included contributions to music technology and production, with projects spanning local and national music communities.

== Personal life ==
Daly was born the second of six siblings at the United States Naval Hospital in Annapolis, Maryland to U.S. Navy Captain George William Daly, Sr., former Deputy Chief of Industrial Relations for the U.S. Navy, and Frances Helen Daly, who encouraged her son's creativity. He showed an aptitude in his early years for science, technology, and music, writing his first song in 4th grade and crafting early electric guitars and sound amplifier circuits. In 8th grade, he invented a device he entered into a local science fair which used light waves to transmit sound across a large hall.

By his early teens, he was playing guitar, electric bass and keyboards, and writing songs. He founded several bands, beginning with The Hangmen. The Hangmen are credited on record with the singles "What a Girl Can't Do", "Faces" and "Bad Goodbye", among others. The song "...What A Girl...", written and recorded by Tom Guernsey and Joe Tripplet, with its Everly Brothers' Wake up Little Susie guitar riff and Bob Berberich's drumming, when added to the band's electric live performances, pushed the Hangmen past The Beatles to the number one position in the Washington, D.C. regional radio charts. Fans of the Hangmen included famed beat poet Allen Ginsberg, Robert F. Kennedy, and Ethel Kennedy. Daly's original song "Faces" is noted in the 21st century as a prototypical punk rock anthem.

Daly is a lifetime member of NARAS (the Grammy organization). Daly is also a lifetime member of Mensa and holds an FCC Amateur Extra-Class radio license.
