= Chopper Hunt =

1984 video game

- Developer: ANALOG Software
- Publisher: Imagic
- Designer: Tom Hudson
- Platforms: Atari 8-bit, Commodore 64
- Release: Buried Bucks; 1982: Atari 8-bit Chopper Hunt; 1984: Atari 8-bit, C64
- Genre: Shoot 'em up
- Mode: Single-player

Chopper Hunt is a side-view shoot 'em up written by Tom Hudson and published by Imagic in 1984 for Atari 8-bit computers and Commodore 64. It was one of the last games from Imagic before the company went out of business. Chopper Hunt is an enhanced version of the Atari 8-bit game Buried Bucks released by ANALOG Software in 1982. In both games, the player uses a helicopter to shoot holes in the ground and unearth money and other items while an airplane drops dirt to repair the terrain. Contemporaneous reviews cited the original concept, but overall the gameplay was considered repetitive.

== Gameplay ==
The bottom third of the screen is a cutaway view of terrain—items beneath the ground are visible—and the player flies a helicopter left and right above it. The joystick button fires bullets which dig holes in the landscape. Bullets arc out in front the helicopter depending on the direction it is facing, and it can also rotate to point out of the screen making the bullets go straight down.

Visible beneath the dirt are bags of money and oil barrels which can be picked up when a path to them is clear. The helicopter must drop-off each treasure on a platform on the left side of the screen to get credit for it.

A plane flies along the top of the screen dropping dirt clods which slowly fall and fill in holes in the terrain.

A life is lost if the helicopter collides with the ground or falling dirt. Collecting and returning all of the items ends the level. In later levels, the landscape is taller so more digging is required, and there's less sky to maneuver in. Underground pools absorb bombs, preventing them from damaging the terrain.

== Development ==
Chopper Hunt was originally published in 1982 as Buried Bucks (with the name sylizied as Buried Buck$) by ANALOG Software, the game publishing label of Atari 8-bit magazine ANALOG Computing. Programmer Tom Hudson documented the bitmapped explosion effect used in the game in an article in ANALOG titled "Graphic Violence". The article includes the 6502 assembly language source code. The same effect is used in a later type-in game for the magazine: Planetary Defense. Hudson told Atari Explorer in 1986 that Buried Bucks was his first Atari 8-bit game and called it "pretty simplistic".

In 1984, Imagic released the game as Chopper Hunt with some alterations to the visuals. A Commodore 64 port was published simultaneously.

== Reception ==
As part of a "Five Great Games for the Atari" article in 1983, John J. Anderson reviewed Buried Bucks: "once in a while a package appears that takes a unique premise and develops it into a new game that bears little resemblance to anything that has come before." He commented, "The level of graphics and sound in the program is utterly professional." Electronic Fun with Computers & Games also reviewed the original release, concluding, "This is a cute premise with no promise. My main complaint is that this game is boring. It goes too quickly from ridiculously easy to impossible, and along the way It completely fails to capture your attention or provide excitement for any prolonged gameplay".

In a 1985 review of the Imagic version in Antic, Jack Powell wrote, "Chopper Hunt would make a very nice public domain game," and "If you plunk down your hard-earned money for this outdated arcade game, you are helping to prove that Barnum is right."

== See also ==
- Boulders and Bombs
