= Computer Title Bout =

1983 video game

- Publisher: The Avalon Hill Game Company
- Platforms: Atari 8-bit, Commodore 64
- Release: 1983
- Genre: Fighting

Computer Title Bout is a video game published in 1983 by The Avalon Hill Game Company for the Atari 8-bit computers and Commodore 64.

== Gameplay ==
Computer Title Bout is a game in which 500 boxers are included with the game.

== Reception ==
Antic stated that Computer Title Bout "gives you the excitement and challenge of real professional boxing without the crowds, noise or blood", concluding that the game "is definitely a sleeper of the year". Rick Teverbaugh reviewed the game for Computer Gaming World, and stated that "Graphically, the game won't astonish you but it will impart enough information and action to let you imagination fill in the gaps. Overall, this is the boxing game that gets the most play in my ring."
