= Yassou =

- Also known as: Yassou Benedict
- Origin: Hudson, New York
- Genres: Indie rock, art pop, dream pop, indie rock, synth pop, orchestral
- Years active: 2010–present
- Members: Lilie Hoy; James Jackson; Alan Krumholz; Thelonious Quimbly; Patrick Aguirre; Van Jackson Weaver
- Website: yassouband.com

Yassou (formally Yassou Benedict) is an American art pop band founded in Hudson, New York in 2010. Residing in Mill Valley, California, the group consists of Lilie Hoy (vocals, bass), James Jackson (guitar, drums, vocals), Alan Krumholz, (guitar), Van Jackson Weaver (guitar), Thelonious Quimby (keyboards) and Patrick Aguirre (drums). Julian Muller (cello) is also a founding member. Yassou uses film to portray themes of destruction, love, power, nostalgia and urban/rural isolation. In 2016, they collaborated with the Louisville Ballet in the world premiere of "How They Fade".

The band defines their music as post-pop and have described their sound as "smokey". Critics have called their sound "genre-defying" an "ethereal brand of rock" and "shaped by sophisticated layering". Yassou is inspired by artists including: Radiohead, Kanye West, Efterklang, Phantogram, Lykke Li, and Sufjan Stevens.

The band writes their music in a forested bungalow studio in Mill Valley, CA. They have released two EPs (Where We Come From in 2011 and In Fits in Dreams in 2013), one Video EP (Untitled in 2016) and five singles.

Yassou has been associated with music executive and producer George Daly and About Records since 2013.

== History ==
Original founders, Jackson, Hoy, Quimby, and Muller met at Hawthorne Valley Waldorf School, a school for performing arts in Ghent, New York. They bonded over singing together in chorus class and through a shared love for Radiohead. Jackson describes, "we would spend hours after practice just listening to whole albums, geeking out on the time signatures, melodies and the sounds."

The name Yassou Benedict comes from a high school friend who was struggling with adolescent psychosis and who was living with the band when they formed in 2010. The friend was going through a period of creating fictitious names for himself, including Yassou Benedict. "Yassou" is a common greeting in Greek, similar to "hello." And "benedict" means "good word."

Their first single "No Lights" was released with an accompanying video in September 2011. Directed and produced by rock musician Steve Durand, the video was "shot in three hours at an abandoned school in Upstate New York, using a skateboard, handheld camera, [and] a few tracks". The video was an official selection at the 2011 Woodstock Film Festival.

Their first EP "Where We Come From" was recorded and produced by Durand at Dioramaland Studios in Hudson, NY and was self-released in March 2011.

In October 2011, the band relocated to San Francisco. They took one car, one trailer, and their Great Dane and drove across the U.S. They met Aguirre in San Francisco and he joined the band in February 2012.

In May 2012, they launched a Kickstarter campaign to raise money for their first full-length album. They stated they wanted their music to remain completely independent and free from any corporate or outside influence.

After reaching their Kickstarter goal in the fall of 2012, they returned to Hudson, New York to record with Durand at Dioramaland. Produced by Durand, their second EP, "In Fits In Dreams" was released on July 2, 2013. The EP featured former Hole and The Smashing Pumpkins' bassist Melissa Auf der Maur on two tracks and contained three music video singles:

- "The Cloisters" features Melissa Auf der Maur and was accepted into the Woodstock Film Festival. The video was a collaboration with Durand who helped film the video one afternoon during a recording session. The song has been called "meditative".
- "In Fits In Dreams" was directed and filmed by Gary Yost, edited by Mark Spencer, with visual effects by Jamie Clay. The video was shot in 8 locations throughout San Francisco and Marin County. "In Fits In Dreams" has been called "poppy" and is about a young boy waiting for nightfall to dream a dream in which his mother gives him direction.
- "Last Cicada" was released in August, 2013. It was directed, edited and filmed by Theo Quimby and Be_EasyBaby over the course of one morning in San Francisco's Golden Gate Park.

Critics called "In Fits In Dreams" "dramatic and willful".

In November 2013, Yassou toured the west coast and Jackson and Hoy relocated their studio from San Francisco to Mill Valley, CA.

In the fall of 2014, Yassou toured the east coast for their SHPWRKD release with Sad Cactus Records.

In April 2015, Yassou released their single "YoungBlood" through OIM Records. "YoungBlood" was featured on the compilation OIM: Vol 1 and was produced by Jeff Saltzman. The song is about the very long and very late night walks Jackson would take to see Hoy when they were falling in love as teenagers.

In 2015, Yassou Benedict became Yassou upon the release of their debut Video EP. The Video EP is untitled and consists of six songs with five accompanying videos. The 8-month project was a collaboration between Yassou and four bay area directors: Gary Yost, Amy Harrity, Peter McCollough and George Daly. There was no physical or digital release, causing critics to name the Video EP "unconventional", "consumer-friendly", and "redefining the album".

In regards to the unconventional release, "the band decided it was time to break away from the monotony of the music industry and prove that they, and other artists in their position, do not need major labels, big budgets, high end studios and a huge production team to create powerful and inspiring material."

The Video EP was called "truly gorgeous", "a powerful visual tale", and "raw and haunting".

"Fall Again" premiered on Billboard in August 2015. The video was co-directed, produced and edited by Hoy and George Daly. Hoy has described its inspiration as "fake rituals to prepare for an inner battle" and from the importance of her bathroom, where the video was filmed.

"To Win / Young Blood" premiered in September 2015. It was directed and produced by Mill Valley-based filmmaker and photographer Gary Yost and featured the synchronized swimming/dance company Aqualillies. The video was shot on Mt. Tamalpais, in Hoy's bathtub, and in an olympic-sized pool. It is the "first fully-infared music video featuring underwater, timelapse and real-time IR cinematography."

"To Sink" premiered in September 2015. It was co-directed by Peter McCollough and Hoy. The song is about "falling in love, with a boy, with an idea, with yourself. It's about being brave enough to lose control and strong enough to regain it." It has been cited as negotiating the concept of impermanence.

"The Woods" premiered in November 2015. Directed by Amy Harrity, the video was called "ambient and intoxicating" and starred Hoy's sister. It "examines the ways in which seemingly contradictory emotions can bleed into one another within a single experience."

"In These Summer Nights" was directed by Hoy and premiered in November 2015.

In January 2016, they toured the west coast and Jackson Weaver joined the band.

In June 2016, Yassou opened for The National at MASS MoCA at a benefit for their alma mater Hawthorne Valley Waldorf School. Band members stated "now more than ever, as Waldorf graduates, we feel it is our responsibility to bring creativity, inspiration, and feeling into the world—and we were honored to do it on such a stage, for our alma mater and alongside our idols."

In the fall of 2015, Yassou was given a commission to compose an original score to open the Louisville Ballet's 65th season. As part of the 2016-2017 they performed the world premiere of "How They Fade" in September 2016 at the Kentucky Center for the Performing Arts. The final collaboration was a performance of music, dance, and visual art. The band was accompanied by the Louisville Orchestra and included Hoy performing on stage as both observer and participant with the ballerinas and with scenic effects by contemporary visual artist Letitia Quesenberry. The piece was co-composed by Jackson and Muller and was choreographed and directed by Louisville Ballet's Artistic and Executive Director Robert Curran. Curran commissioned Yassou after viewing their video "To Sink". The piece is a "physically dynamic and demanding exploration of how those feelings of nostalgia affect human connection — how we process our relationships, past and future" and received good reviews.

In fall 2016, Yassou established itself as a creative content group.

== Touring ==
Yassou has played with: The National, Melissa Auf der Maur, Louisville Orchestra, Buke and Gase, Sister Sparrow & the Dirty Birds, Lena Fayre, Willis Earl Beal, and Michael McDonald.

They have performed at festivals including Broke LA 2016, CMJ Music Marathon 2014 and Sofar Sounds concerts and have been touring the east coast and west coast since 2013.

== Writing process ==
Says Hoy about her writing process: "While writing I often reminisce about the feeling of driving on country roads at night where we grew up, all the windows down and the cool air whipping your face after a hot summer day. That feeling is pure life, similar to what you feel when a song overtakes you."

Hoy describes their music arrangement as coming "from a place of ignorance. We get bored easily… but in some way it is easier for us to write with no construct or boundaries."

"Overall we do not work from a formula. The more freedom there is the more likely you are to stumble upon something refreshing and instinctual, thus capturing your real emotion which will then be translated more clearly to the listener."

"It's a collaborative thing between James and myself," she said. "He has the composing abilities in the band and initiates all the songs. I bring the visual aspect. I've always related to music that way. I get visual images when I'm writing lyrics, so it's a natural thing for me to want to make videos."

== Musical style ==
Yassou has been compared to Radiohead, FKA Twigs, the XX, The National, Bjork, St. Vincent, and Passion Pit.

They have been described as an "unconventional act", and "a band of layers". They "impeccably combine musical complexity with melodic lushness" and have "seemingly infinite, yet masterfully minimal, tracks." The band describes themselves as "crossing genres" or that they don't think about genres at all. Furthermore, the band members have been described as having a dissimilar taste in music, with early influences ranging from Lykke Li to Aphex Twin to Mastodon.

Hoy's voice has been described as "ethereal", "haunting" and having "the celestial purity of a young Joni Mitchell". Her lyrical style is not narrative or about storytelling and "has a refined quality that betrays her choir background". The band references darkness in many interviews and as key to their musical inspiration, with Hoy describing her aesthetic as "minimal and emotional".

The band has also labeled Haruki Murakami novels as having a large impact on their emotional aesthetic.
