= Autodesk Animator =

2D animation software

- Screenshot
- Developers: Jim Kent, Yost Group, Autodesk
- Release: 1989; 37 years ago
- Final release: "Studio" / 1995; 31 years ago
- Operating system: MS-DOS, Windows 95
- Platform: x86
- Type: Animation software
- License: Proprietary (Animator Studio); Freeware / BSD license (Animator Pro)
- Website: web.archive.org/web/20191227184119/http://www.animatorpro.org/

Animation made with Animator Pro

Autodesk Animator is a 2D computer animation and painting program published in 1989 for MS-DOS. It was considered groundbreaking when initially released.

== Functionality ==
Animator gave the ability to do frame-by-frame animation (creating each frame as an individual picture, much like Traditional animation). Animator Studio also had tweening features (transforming one shape into another by letting the computer draw each in-between shape onto a separate frame). Animator and Animator Pro supported FLI and FLC animation file formats, while Animator Studio also supported the AVI format. Animator was particularly strong in Palette based editing, effects (like Color cycling) and animations a favored technology in the time of indexed CGA and VGA graphics modes.

Unlike other DOS software from that time, Animator was not restricted by the 640 kilobyte conventional memory limitation as it utilized a DOS extender by Phar Lap. Animator's combination of twenty tools multiplied by twenty inks, 3D 'optics,' unparalleled palette handling, custom fonts and many other useful features (such as its own internal scripting language POCO) put it many years ahead of better known animation tools of the time.

== Development history ==
Animator originates back to its author's Jim Kent earlier program Cyber Paint for the Atari ST. Jim Kent evolved in 1989 his software into Animator for Gary Yost's "Yost Group" for 80286 PCs with MS-DOS. Animator was then licensed to Autodesk, who published the software as Autodesk Animator.

=== Releases ===
Animator was debuted at SIGGRAPH 1989, featuring a VGA graphics mode of 320×200 pixels with 256 colors.

In July 1991, the successor Animator Pro was released, with the significant improvement of allowing almost any resolution and color depth. The software was sold for approximately US$800 (US$1,800 in 2025), significantly more expensive than the previous version, addressing the professional audience.

Released in 1995, Animator Studio was a complete re-write for Windows 95; however, it was not anymore developed by the Yost Group.

=== Discontinuation and legacy ===
Eventually development of the product ended and support was discontinued by Autodesk. The trademark for "Autodesk Animator", filed on December 18, 1989, expired on July 21, 1997.

Jim Kent kept copyrights to the 300,000 lines source code base of Animator Pro, and allowed it to be made available publicly under the open-source BSD license in 2009. The original 256 color Animator version for DOS is also provided as a freeware download. After some initial code review porting to modern platforms was started on GitHub. As of April 2014 most of the assembly language source code had been ported to platform-agnostic C code and SDL was used as the target back-end framework.

== Reception ==
Animator was considered to be groundbreaking in the field of computer animation when it was initially released. In 1989 Animator won PC Magazine's "6th Annual Technical Excellence Award for Graphics".

Also, video game developers used the software for intros and other animated sequences in their games, for instance Formula One Grand Prix (1991, MicroProse), Cannon Fodder (1993, Virgin Interactive) and Jazz Jackrabbit 2 (1998, Epic Games); animators used the software for animation for shows such as Dr. Katz, Professional Therapist.

The program worked so well and had enough of an impact, that it convinced James Cameron that CGI can create a character in his next film, Terminator 2: Judgment Day; Autodesk did advertisement with this.

There were also books written about Animator for instance "Inside Autodesk Animator: The Complete Guide to Animation on a PC" by New Riders Publishing in 1990.

== See also ==
- FLI/FLC Animator's file format
- Deluxe Paint
- List of 2D animation software
