= ANALOG Computing =

Defunct Atari 8-bit computer magazine

- June 1986 cover
- Frequency: Bimonthly (1981-83); Monthly (1983-89)
- Founder: Lee H. Pappas; Michael DesChesnes
- Founded: 1981
- First issue: January / February 1981
- Final issue Number: December 1989; 79
- Country: USA
- Based in: Worcester, MA; North Hollywood, CA
- ISSN: 0744-9917
- OCLC: 925072643

ANALOG Computing was an American computer magazine devoted to Atari 8-bit computers. It was published from 1981 until 1989. In addition to reviews and tutorials, ANALOG printed multiple type-in programs in each issue. Almost every issue included a video game written in machine language—as opposed to Atari BASIC—which were uncommon in competing magazines. Such games were accompanied by the assembly language source code. ANALOG also sold commercial games, two books of type-in software, and access to a custom bulletin-board system. After the Atari ST was released, coverage of the new systems moved to an ST-Log section of the magazine before spinning off into a separate publication under the ST-Log name.

The title began as an acronym for Atari Newsletter And Lots Of Games, which was only spelled out in the first two issues. Originally the title as printed on the cover was A.N.A.L.O.G. 400/800 Magazine, but starting with the sixth issue it was shortened to A.N.A.L.O.G. Computing. Though the dots remained in the logo, over time it became ANALOG or ANALOG Computing inside the magazine. The magazine's primary competitor in the US was Antic.

The program listings were covered under the magazine's copyright protections, and users were granted the right to type them into their computer for personal use, so long as they were not sold or copied.

== History ==
ANALOG was co-launched by Lee H. Pappas and Michael DesChesnes who met at a Star Trek convention in 1978. The first issue of the magazine was January / February 1981. It was published bi-monthly through the November / December 1983 issue and then monthly beginning with the January 1984 issue.

Following the Atari ST announcement in early 1985, ANALOG expanded its scope to include the new computer line. Starting with the April 1986 issue, ST coverage was consolidated into a supplementary section titled ST-Log. With its 10th issue, in January 1987 ST-Log became a separate magazine and ANALOG returned to being fully devoted to the Atari 8-bit computers. (This paralleled STart magazine being spun off from Antic.)

In the April 1988 issues of ST-Log and ANALOG Computing, Pappas announced that both magazines were under new ownership and the offices moved from Worcester, Massachusetts to North Hollywood, California. Circulation was interrupted between issues 58 and 59 (from October 1987 to March 1988). Details of the acquisition were not mentioned in the editorial, but the masthead showed the publisher as L.F.P., Inc. (for Larry Flynt Publications). Subscribers were not told ahead of time.

In the September 1989 issues of both ANALOG and ST-Log, it was announced that the two magazines would be recombined into a single Atari resource under the ANALOG name, beginning with the November issue. Two issues of the combined magazine were published before L.F.P., Inc. shut it down. STart magazine reported this, incorrectly claiming that both magazines were dropped less than a month after the announcement, but correctly reporting that production staff merged into another publication owned by Pappas, Video Games & Computer Entertainment. The final issue of ANALOG Computing was December 1989, #79. There was no mention that this would be the last issue.

== Additional products ==
=== ANALOG Software ===
In its early years, ANALOG Computing sold games via mail order under the name ANALOG Software. Several of these were written by magazine staff members. Some games were advertised, but never completed or published, such as Sunday Driver and Titan.

Released games

- Crash Dive (different from the Brian Moriarty text adventure printed as a type-in listing)
- Star Sentry
- Buried Bucks, later published by Imagic as Chopper Hunt
- Race in Space, later printed as a type-in listing in the magazine
- Carnival, licensed from Sega

=== Books ===
ANALOG published two books of program listings and tutorials. The ANALOG Compendium (1983) contains "the best Atari home computer programs from the first ten issues." An Atari 8-bit Extra from ANALOG Computing (1987) contains previously unpublished programs.

The ANALOG Computing Pocket Reference Card was published in 1985 and sold for US$7.95. It contains a summary of Atari BASIC commands, player/missile memory layout, hardware register and operating system addresses, ATASCII characters, graphics modes, and other information.

=== Bulletin board ===
The ANALOG Computing Telecommunications System, or ANALOG Computing TCS, was a custom bulletin board system accessible only through paid subscription. After the TCS launched in May 1985, an 8-page ANALOG Computing TCS Guide was bound into an issue of the magazine.

== ANALOG Computing writers ==
=== Staff ===
- Lee Pappas
- Tom Hudson
- Brian Moriarty
- Clayton Walnum

=== Contributors ===
- Charles F. Johnson
- Russ Wetmore

== See also ==
- Antic, the other major Atari magazine in the US
- Atari User, a British Atari magazine
- Page 6, one of the longest running Atari magazines
