= Jim Kent =

American research scientist and computer programmer

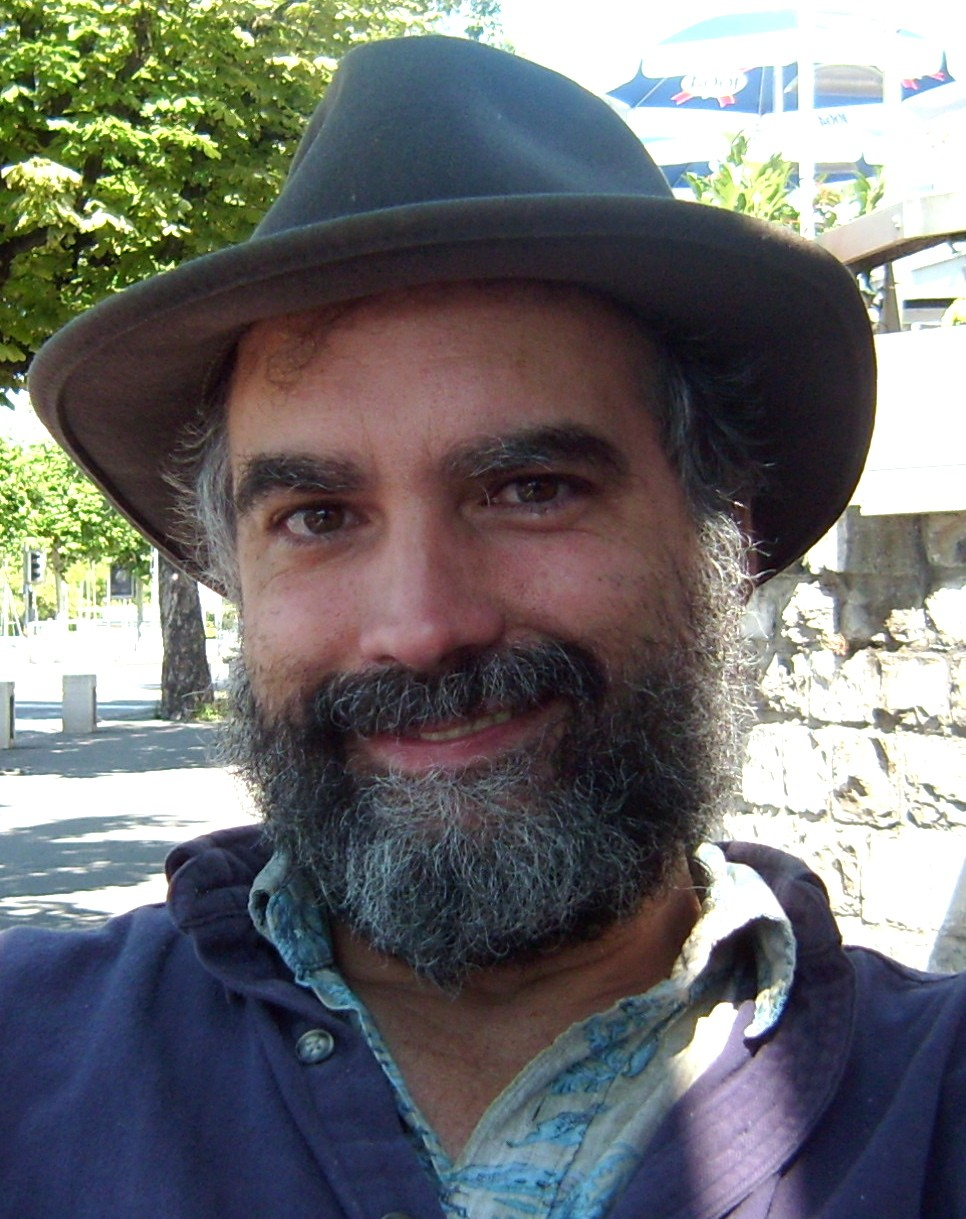
- Photo courtesy of Jim Kent.
- Born: February 10, 1960 (age 66); Hawaii
- Education: University of California, Santa Cruz
- Awards: Overton Prize; Benjamin Franklin Award (Bioinformatics)
- Scientific career
- Thesis: Patching and painting the working draft of the human genome (2002)
- Doctoral advisor: Alan M Zahler
- Other academic advisors: David Haussler
- Website: users.soe.ucsc.edu/~kent/

William James Kent (born February 10, 1960) is an American research scientist and computer programmer. He has been a contributor to genome database projects and the 2003 winner of the Benjamin Franklin Award.

== Early life ==
Kent was born in Hawaii and grew up in San Francisco, California, United States.

== Computer animation ==
Kent began his programming career in 1983 with Island Graphics Inc. where he wrote the Aegis Animator program for the Amiga home computer. This program combined polygon tweening in 3D with simple 2D cel-based animation. In 1985 he founded and ran a software company, Dancing Flame, which adapted the Aegis Animator to the Atari ST, and created Cyber Paint for that machine. Cyber Paint was a 2D animation program that brought together a wide variety of animation and paint functionality and the delta-compressed animation format developed for CAD-3D. The user could move freely between animation frames and paint arbitrarily, or utilize various animation tools for automatic tweening movement across frames. Cyber Paint was one of the first, if not the first, consumer program that enabled the user to paint across time in a compressed digital video format. Later he developed a similar program, the Autodesk Animator for PC compatibles, where the image compression improved to the point it could play off of hard disk, and one could paint using "inks" that performed algorithmic transformations such as smoothing, transparency, and tiled patterns. The Autodesk Animator was used to create artwork for a wide variety of video games.

== Involvement with the Human Genome Project ==
In 2000, he wrote a program, GigAssembler, that allowed the publicly funded Human Genome Project to assemble and publish the first human genome sequence. His efforts were motivated by the research needs of himself and his colleagues, but also out of concern that the data might be made proprietary via patents by Celera Genomics. In their close race with Celera, Kent and the UCSC Professor David Haussler quickly built a modest cluster of 50 commodity personal computers running a Linux-based operating system to run the software. In contrast, Celera was using what was thought then to be one of the most powerful civilian supercomputers in the world. Kent's first assembly on the human genome was released on June 22. Celera finished its assembly three days later on June 25, and the dual results were announced at the White House on June 26. On July 7, 2000, the Santa Cruz data was made publicly available on the World Wide Web while the research paper describing this publicly funded genome was published in February 2001 special issue of Nature, in parallel with Celera's results in the journal Science. In 2002 Tim O'Reilly described Kent's work as "the most significant work of open source development in the past year". While all of Kent's genomics software is open source in the sense that the source code can be downloaded and read for free, and all of the software can be freely used for academic, nonprofit, and personal use, some of it requires a license, either from UCSC or from Kent Informatics Inc., for commercial use.

After GigAssembler, Kent went on to write BLAT (BLAST-like alignment tool) and the UCSC Genome Browser to help analyze important genome data. Kent continues to work at UCSC primarily on web tools to help understand the human genome. He helps maintain and upgrade the browser, and has worked on comparative genomics, Parasol, a job control management software for the UCSC kilocluster, and the ENCODE Project.
