= Batteries Included (company) =

Software and hardware developer

- Founded: 1978; 48 years ago, in Toronto, Ontario
- Defunct: 1987
- Fate: Purchased by Electronic Arts
- Headquarters: Richmond Hill, Ontario, Canada
- Key people: Alan Krofchick; Robbie Krofchik; Marcie Swartz; L. Brian Swartz
- Products: PaperClip; DEGAS

Batteries Included was a computer software and hardware company based in the Toronto area. It developed products for the Apple II, Atari 8-bit computers, Atari ST, Commodore 64, and MS-DOS. The company was best known in the 1980s for its PaperClip word processor, which was available for the Atari 8-bit computers and Commodore 64, and the DEGAS bitmap painting program for the Atari ST. Batteries Included was acquired by Electronic Arts in 1987.

== History ==
Batteries Included was founded by siblings Alan Krofchick, Robbie Krofchick and Marcie Swartz in 1978 as a calculator and personal computer retail store. The hand-held electronic devices they sold were always advertised as "batteries not included," so they included the batteries for free and named themselves Batteries Included. The company began to develop its own computer software and hardware and became a multimillion-dollar multi-faceted company, charging its way into the international computer software and accessory market. Michael Reichmann joined the company in its early years and eventually became its president in the mid-1980s.

The company's first retail location was established at Village by the Grange, (109 McCaul St, Toronto, ON). Head offices were later re-located to 30 Mural Street in Richmond Hill, Ontario. The company also had a satellite office in California. At its peak, BI employed over 60 people.

Batteries Included was purchased by Electronic Arts in 1987, which cancelled most of its upcoming projects but continued to market products under the Batteries Included name.

== Products ==
=== PaperClip ===
PaperClip, the company's flagship product, was first released for the Commodore PET in 1982, and later for the Commodore 64 and Atari 8-bit computers. The word processor was developed by Steve Douglas who formed a relationship with Batteries Included owners Robbie and Alan Krofchick through the retail store. PaperClip became one of the highest selling home management programs, reaching No. 1 on "Billboard's Top Computer Software" chart and spending over 70 weeks on the charts.

In 1986, Batteries Included released PaperClip II for the Commodore 128.

PaperClip III was released by Electronic Arts in 1987, following its acquisition of Batteries Included. Later Gold Disk released desktop publishing application PaperClip Publisher.

=== HomePak ===
In 1984, Batteries Included released the integrated software suite HomePak, combining word-processor, database and communications modules into one application.

=== Product listing ===
- PaperClip – word processor
- PaperClip II – word processor
- Delphi's Oracle (later The Consultant) – database
- Bus Card – IEEE interface card
- Bus Card II – IEEE interface card
- HomePak – office suite
- B.I.-80 80-column display card (for C64 only)
- I*S Talk - a full-featured GEM-based telecommunications program
- Isgur Portfolio System - an investment management program
- BTS The Spreadsheet - spreadsheet program
- TimeLink - an electronic diary program for planning and record-keeping
- I*S Time and Billing - a professional office administration program
- B/GRAPH Elite - a graphics/charting and statistical analysis package

For the Atari ST:

- DEGAS – bitmap painting application
- DEGAS Elite
- Thunder! The writer's Assistant - spellchecker
