= Antic (magazine) =

Defunct Atari 8-bit computer magazine

- February 1987 cover
- First issue: April 1982
- Final issue: June/July 1990
- Company: Antic Publishing
- ISSN: 0745-2527

Antic was a print magazine devoted to Atari 8-bit computers and later the Atari ST. It was named after the ANTIC chip in the 8-bit line which, in concert with CTIA or GTIA, generates the display. The magazine was published by Antic Publishing from April 1982 until June/July 1990.Antic printed type-in programs (usually in Atari BASIC), reviews, and tutorials, among other articles. Each issue contained one type-in game as "Game of the Month." In 1986, STart magazine was spun off to exclusively cover the Atari ST line.

Its main rival in the United States was ANALOG Computing, another long-lived magazine devoted to the Atari 8-bit line. Multi-system magazines COMPUTE! and Family Computing also served Atari 8-bit owners with type-in programs.

Starting in 1984, the catalog for Antic Software was bound into issues of Antic.

== History ==
NASA programmer Jim Capparell was an early Atari 8-bit computer owner. He quit his job on 15 January 1982 to found a magazine covering the 8-bit systems. On-Line Systems, Broderbund, and Synapse Software agreed to purchase advertising in the new publication, and Capparell's staff distributed the first issue of 30 pages at the March 1982 West Coast Computer Faire. The first issue of Antic was published in April 1982. While it began as a bimonthly magazine, within a year it had gone monthly.

By Christmas 1983 the magazine was 148 pages, but in 1984 Antic saw advertising sales drop by 50% in 90 days. The Antic Software catalog, bound into each issue, contained public domain software, re-released products from the Atari Program Exchange after it folded, and original titles. It helped the company avoid bankruptcy, and in 1985 it started II Computing for the Apple II.

In 1984, after the Atari Program Exchange was closed by Atari, Inc., Antic started selling former APX games and application software under the name APX Classics from Antic and solicited new submissions as Antic Software. The Antic Software catalog was bound into issues of the magazine.

In 1985 Antic began ST Resource, a section of the magazine devoted to the Atari ST line. In 1986 it began STart magazine for the computer. The daughter magazine would outlive its parent by about a year. When Antic ended, it continued as a section of STart, appearing in six more issues. A magazine for the Amiga, the primary competitor of the Atari ST, was published from 1989 until 1991 under the name Antic's Amiga Plus.

The last issue of Antic was June–July 1990. All told, 88 issues and a "Best of" book were published.

== TYPO ==
A utility called TYPO ("Type Your Program Once," a play on typographical error) was used to verify that programs were typed in correctly that generated set of check-sums for different portions of the lines of code, but it didn't help users find exactly which line had the error. TYPO was later succeeded by TYPO II, a smaller, faster program that generates a checksum two letter code for each Atari BASIC line entered in a program. By comparing each line's checksum with that printed in the magazine, the reader could be sure they typed the BASIC source correctly before entering the next line of code.

Versions of TYPO were also published and used (with permission) by Page 6. ANALOG Computing also used a two-letter checksum code for their type-in programs they offered and was interoperable with Antic's TYPO II.
