= The Sumerian Game =

1964 video game

- Picture of gameplay
- Designer: Mabel Addis
- Programmer: William McKay
- Writer: Mabel Addis
- Platform: IBM 7090
- Release: 1964; 62 years ago
- Genre: Strategy (text-based)
- Mode: Single-player

The Sumerian Game was an early text-based strategy video game of land and resource management. It was developed as part of a joint research project between the Board of Cooperative Educational Services of Westchester County, New York, and IBM in 1964–1966 for investigation of the use of computer-based simulations in schools. It was designed by Mabel Addis, then a fourth-grade teacher, and programmed by William McKay for the IBM 7090 time-shared mainframe computer. The first version of the early mainframe game was played by a group of 30 sixth-grade students in 1964, and a revised version featuring refocused gameplay and added narrative and audiovisual elements was played by a second group of students in 1966.

The game is composed of three segments, representing the reigns of three successive rulers of the city of Lagash in Sumer around 3500 BC. In each segment the game asks the players how to allocate workers and grain over a series of rounds while accommodating the effects of their prior decisions, random disasters, and technological innovations, with each segment adding complexity. At the conclusion of the project the game was not put into widespread use, though it was used as a demonstration in the BOCES Research Center in Yorktown Heights, New York, and made available by "special arrangement" with BOCES into at least the early 1970s.

A description of the game was given to Doug Dyment in 1968, and he recreated a version of the first segment of the game as King of Sumeria. This game was expanded on in 1971 by David H. Ahl as Hamurabi, which he published in DEC's educational newsletter, Edu and as part of the collection in 101 BASIC Computer Games in 1973. This led to many early strategy and city-building games on many timesharing and home computer platforms as the BASIC code was easily ported and modified. The Sumerian Game has been described as the first video game with a narrative, as well as the first edutainment game. As a result, Mabel Addis has been called the first female video game designer and the first writer for a video game. A recreation of the game, based on the available information, was released for Windows in 2024.

== Gameplay ==
A student playing the game at the teleprinter, with one of the projector images in the background

The Sumerian Game is a largely text-based strategy video game centered on resource management. The game, set around 3500 BC, has players act as three successive rulers of the city of Lagash in Sumer—Luduga I, II, and III—over three segments of increasingly complex economic simulation. Two versions of the game were created, both intended for play by a classroom of students with a single person inputting commands into a teleprinter, which would output responses from the mainframe computer. The second version had a stronger narrative component to the game's text and interspersed the game with taped audio lectures, presented as the discussions of the ruler's court of advisors, corresponding with images on a slide projector. In both versions, the player enters numbers in response to questions posed by the game.

In the first segment of the game, the player plays a series of rounds—limited to 30 in the second version of the game—in which they are given information about the current population, acres of farmland, number of farmers, grain harvested that round, and stored grain. The rounds start in 3500 BC, and are meant to represent seasons. The player then selects how much grain will be used as food, seed for planting, and storage. After making their selections, the game calculates the effect of the player's choices on the population for the next round. Additionally, after each round, the game selects whether to report several events. The city may be struck with a random disaster, such as a fire or flood, which destroys a percentage of the city's population and harvest. Independent of disasters, a percentage of the stored grain may also be lost to rot and rats. Additionally, the game may report a technological innovation which has a positive effect on subsequent rounds, such as reducing the amount of grain that may spoil or reducing the number of farmers needed for each acre of land. Several of these innovations require the player to have first "exhibited some good judgement", such as by adequately feeding their population for multiple rounds.

In the second and third segments of the game, the city's population and grain are adjusted to preset levels, regardless of the player's performance in the prior segment, to represent that some time has passed since the decisions of the prior ruler. The player then again plays through a series of rounds. In the second segment, the player can also apply workers towards the development of several crafts—which in turn can result in innovations—while the third increases the complexity of the simulation by adding trade and expansion choices. In the original version of the game, the second and third segments were expansions on the first, requiring the same choices around grain in addition to the new choices. In the second version of the game, the second segment was refocused. The rounds were limited to 10 and the player was no longer required to make choices around grain allocation, but instead only make decisions about applying workers to farming or crafts. The third segment was not changed, though plans were made to either also remove the grain allocation choices and add more choices around trade, colonization, and war, or else to instead make the third segment a combination of the first two segments.

== Development ==
In 1962, the Board of Cooperative Educational Services (BOCES) of Westchester County, New York, began a series of discussions with researchers at IBM, which was headquartered in Westchester County, about the use of computers in education research. The BOCES system had been established in New York to help rural school districts pool resources, and the Westchester BOCES Superintendent Dr. Noble Gividen believed that computers, along with computer simulation games like the Carnagie Tech Management Game being used in colleges, could be used to improve educational outcomes at small districts in Westchester. The Westchester County BOCES and IBM held a joint workshop, led by Bruse Moncreiff and James Dinneen of IBM along with Dr. Richard Wing, curriculum research coordinator for BOCES, in June 1962, involving ten teachers from the area to discuss ways of using simulations in classroom curricula. Based on the result of the workshop, BOCES applied for a US$96,000 (equivalent to $1,022,000 in 2025) grant from the U.S. Office of Education that December to continue to study the concept for 18 months as a joint project between IBM and the New York State Education Department, receiving almost US$104,000 (equivalent to $1,107,000 in 2025) instead for "Cooperative Research Project 1948".

The project began in February 1963 under the direction of Dr. Wing, who asked for proposals from nine teachers. One of the teachers who had been at the workshop, Mabel Addis, proposed an expansion of an idea given by Moncreiff at the summer workshop: an economic model of a civilization, intended to teach basic economic theory. The idea had been developed during the workshop as a paper game under the name "The Sumerian Play". Moncreiff had been inspired by prior research, especially the paper "Teaching through Participation in Micro-simulations of Social Organization" by Richard Meier, and by the board game Monopoly, and wanted to use the ancient Sumerian civilization as the setting to counter what he saw as a trend in school curriculum to ignore pre-Greek civilizations, despite evidence of their importance to early history. Addis, a fourth-grade teacher at Katonah Elementary School, agreed with Moncreiff about the undervaluation of pre-Greek civilizations in schools, and had studied Mesopotamian civilizations in college. Her proposal was approved and she began work with IBM programmer William McKay to develop the game.

The game itself, The Sumerian Game, was designed and written by Addis and programmed by McKay in the Fortran programming language for an IBM 7090 time-shared mainframe computer. The game was developed at BOCES in Yorktown Heights, New York, with the file name "suilxr"; simultaneously, IBM developed a different, shorter version that included only the first segment with the file name "sum9rx" at the Thomas J. Watson Research Center in Yorktown Heights. Like many early mainframe games, The Sumerian Game was only run on a single computer. Commands were entered and results printed with an IBM 1050 teleprinter, with associated images shown on a slide projector. A few students played the two versions as they were being developed, and the researchers ran one play session of Addis's game with 30 sixth-grade students. Project 1948 concluded in August 1964, and a report on its outcome given to the Office of Education in 1965 listing the eight "subprojects" that had been proposed in it, of which The Sumerian Game was the only game.

Two weeks after its conclusion a new project was started as Cooperative Research Project 2148, with two more grants given beginning in 1966 totaling over US$194,000 (equivalent to $2,014,000 in 2025), focusing on the first project's progress with the game and to run through 1967. This project created three games: The Sierra Leone Game, The Free Enterprise Game, and an expansion of The Sumerian Game. Addis rewrote and expanded the game in the summer of 1966 by adding a stronger narrative flow to how the advisor tells the player about the events of the city, refocusing the second segment of the game on the new concepts introduced, and interspersing the game with taped audio lectures corresponding with more directly related images on a slide projector. These have been described as the first cutscenes. A 1973 summary guide to educational games described The Sierra Leone Game as being very similar to The Sumerian Game, including having interspersed slides and audio lectures, with only the context and terminology changed. The researchers conducted a playtest of the new version of The Sumerian Game with another 30 sixth-grade students the following school year, and produced a report in 1967.

== Legacy ==
"Family tree" of the various versions of The Sumerian Game and its immediate descendants such as Hamurabi

BOCES copyrighted The Sumerian Game in 1964. The grants for the second version of the game were in part to create a "center of demonstration" at the BOCES Research Center in Yorktown Heights for computer-assisted instruction. To this end, following the creation of the second version of the game, the first segment was reprogrammed by Jimmer Leonard, a graduate student in Social Relations at Johns Hopkins University, for the IBM 1401, to be used at demonstrations at the BOCES Research Center. Further revisions to the other sections of the game were considered, but no further grants for the project were received and no further changes were made. The project was mentioned in Time and Life magazines in 1966. The game was made available to other schools by "special arrangement" with Westchester County BOCES into at least the early 1970s. In 1969, professor Herbert Hallworth of the University of Calgary reported that the computer science department there had recreated the game for the FOCAL programming language as an educational tool and was in the process of writing an assembly language version.

In 1968, however, Digital Equipment Corporation (DEC) employee Doug Dyment gave a talk about computers in education at the University of Alberta, and after the talk a woman who had once seen The Sumerian Game described it to him. Dyment decided to recreate the game as an early program for the FOCAL programming language, recently developed at DEC, and programmed it for a DEC PDP-8 minicomputer. He named the result King of Sumeria. Needing the game to run in the smallest memory configuration available for the computer, he included only the first segment of the game. He also chose to rename the ruler to the more famous Babylonian king Hammurabi, misspelled as "Hamurabi". Dyment's game, sometimes retitled The Sumer Game, proved popular in the programming community: Jerry Pournelle recalled in 1989 that "half the people I know wrote a Hammurabi program back in the 1970s; for many, it was the first program they'd ever written in their lives".

Around 1971, DEC employee David H. Ahl wrote a version of The Sumer Game in the BASIC programming language and published it in DEC's educational newsletter, Edu. Unlike FOCAL, BASIC was widely available on personal computers, then termed microcomputers, making it a much more popular language. In 1973, Ahl published 101 BASIC Computer Games, a best-selling book of games written in BASIC which included his version of The Sumer Game. The expanded version was renamed Hamurabi and added an end-of-game performance appraisal, based on a similar concept in James A. Storer's The Pollution Game (1970), which was also included in BASIC Computer Games as King. In addition to the multiple versions of The Sumer Game and Hamurabi, several simulation games have been created as expansions of the core game. These include The Pollution Game and Kingdom (1974) by Lee Schneider and Todd Voros, which was then expanded to Dukedom (1976). Other derivations include Santa Paravia en Fiumaccio (1978) by George Blank; Santa Paravia added the concept of city building management to the basic structure of Hamurabi, making The Sumerian Game an antecedent to the city-building genre as well as an early strategy game.

As The Sumerian Game was created during the early history of video games as part of research into new uses for computer simulations, it pioneered several developments in the medium. In addition to being a prototype of the strategy and city-building genres, The Sumerian Game has been described as the first video game with a narrative, as well as the first edutainment game. As a result, Mabel Addis has been called the first female video game designer and the first writer for a video game. The original code for The Sumerian Game is lost, but the projector slides and three printouts of individual game sessions were found in 2012 and donated to The Strong National Museum of Play, where they are kept in the Brian Sutton-Smith Library and Archives of Play. A recreation of the game by video game historian Andrea Contato, using the archived materials, was released for Windows in August 2024.

== Sources ==
- Ahl, David (1978). BASIC Computer Games (2nd ed.). Workman Publishing. ISBN 978-0-89480-052-8.
- Ahl, David (1984). Big Computer Games. Creative Computing Press. ISBN 978-0-916688-40-0.
- Contato, Andrea (2024). The Sumerian Game: A Digital Resurrection.
- Smith, Alexander (2019). They Create Worlds: The Story of the People and Companies That Shaped the Video Game Industry. Vol. 1: 1971 – 1982. CRC Press. ISBN 978-1-138-38990-8.
- Zuckerman, David W.; Horn, Robert E. (1973). The Guide to Simulations/Games for Education and Training. Information Resources. ISBN 0-912864-04-4.
