= Hamurabi (video game) =

1968 video game

- Screenshot of gameplay
- Designer: Doug Dyment
- Platforms: PDP-8, personal computer
- Release: 1968 (FOCAL); 1973 (BASIC)
- Genres: Strategy game, text-based game
- Mode: Single-player

Hamurabi is a text-based strategy video game of land and resource management. It was first developed under the name King of Sumeria or The Sumer Game by Doug Dyment in 1968 at Digital Equipment Corporation as a computer game for fellow employee Richard Merrill's newly invented FOCAL programming language.

The game consists of ten rounds wherein the player, as the ancient Babylonian king Hammurabi, manages how much of their grain to spend on crops for the next round, feeding their people, and purchasing additional land, while dealing with random variations in crop yields and plagues. The Sumer Game was inspired by The Sumerian Game, a much more in-depth text-based economic simulation intended for children, developed from 1964 to 1966 by designer and elementary school teacher Mabel Addis and IBM programmer William McKay.

Multiple versions of the game were created for the FOCAL language, but around 1971 David H. Ahl ported it to DEC BASIC and in 1973 published it in 101 BASIC Computer Games. This was later republished in Microsoft BASIC form in 1978's BASIC Computer Games. His expanded version of the game, titled Hamurabi, quickly became the more prominent version due to the popularity of both the book and the programming language. Hamurabi influenced many later strategy and simulation games and is also an antecedent to the city-building genre.

== Gameplay ==
Hamurabi is a text-based strategy video game centered on resource management in which the player, identified in the text as the ancient Babylonian king Hammurabi, enters numbers in response to questions posed by the game. The resources that the player must manage are people, acres of land, and bushels of grain. These are managed over the course of ten rounds, each of which represents a year. Each person can farm a set amount of land, which produces grain. Grain, in turn, can be used to feed people, who otherwise die the following round, or planted for the following year's crop. The player may also buy or sell land to their neighbors each turn in exchange for grain. Each round begins with an adviser stating "Hamurabi: I beg to report to you" the current status of the city, including the prior year's harvest and change in population, followed by a series of questions as to how many bushels of grain to spend on land, seeds, and feeding the people.

The game's variations are driven by random numbers: the price of land is randomly decided each round from between 17 and 26 bushels per acre, the amount of bushels generated each round is randomly decided, random amounts of bushels are eaten by rats, and new people come to the city each year in random amounts. Each year also presents the possibility of a plague reducing the population by half. The game ends after ten rounds, or earlier if the entire population of the city dies or at least 45 percent of the people starve in a single round. The end-game appraisal, added in the 1973 version of the game, compares the player to historical rulers—such as "Your heavy-handed performance smacks of Nero and Ivan IV."

== Development ==
In 1962, Westchester County, New York and IBM began studying the use of computers in education, using a grant from the U.S. Office of Education to produce "economic games" for sixth-grade students. One, The Sumerian Game (1964), was a model of ancient Sumerian civilization, written and designed by elementary-school teacher Mabel Addis with corresponding slide projector images and programmed by William McKay of IBM. The early mainframe game, set in 3500 B.C., has players act as rulers of the city of Lagash. In 1966 Addis revised the game and interspersed it with cutscenes of taped audio lectures with revised slide projector images.

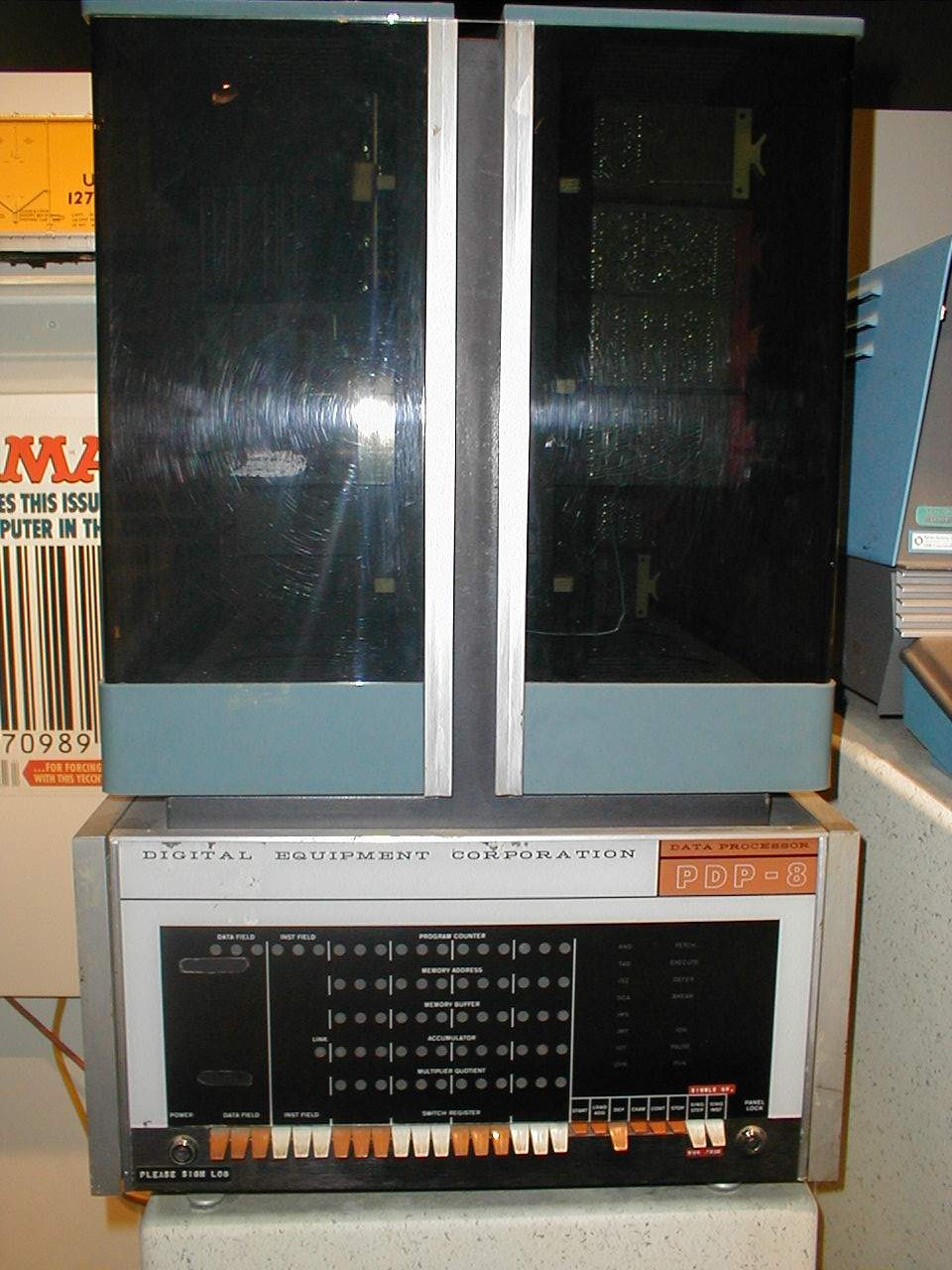
An original DEC PDP-8 minicomputer

In 1968, Digital Equipment Corporation (DEC) employee Richard Merrill invented the FOCAL programming language. Fellow employee Doug Dyment heard a description of The Sumerian Game after a talk at the University of Alberta, and as an early program for the language developed King of Sumeria, programming it for a DEC PDP-8 minicomputer. The game is sometimes erroneously attributed to Merrill in 1969, but 1969 and 1973 program catalogs by the Digital Equipment Computer Users Society (DECUS) list Dyment as the original developer, though they also renamed it to The Sumer Game.

The game was originally described as: "This is a simulation program/game which will run on a minimal PDP-8 system. The economy of a Sumerian city in the year 3000 B. C. is simulated in the fashion of a modern-day 'business game.'" "Business games" were text-based business management simulation games, such as The Management Game, which was used in business schools such as at Carnegie Mellon University since at least 1958. By 1961, there were over 89 different business and economic simulation games in use, with various graphical capabilities. The final game was, according to Dyment, "the largest piece of FOCAL-8 code that could fit in a 4K machine: there was literally not room for a single extra character". As a result, the game uses shortened forms for much of the text, including spelling the player-controlled ruler, changed from Luduga to the Babylonian king Hammurabi, as "Hamurabi".

Multiple versions of The Sumer Game were created. Jerry Pournelle recalled in 1989 that "half the people I know wrote a Hammurabi program back in the 1970s; for many, it was the first program they'd ever written in their lives". The 1973 DECUS catalog additionally lists a French-language version by Belgians J. F. Champarnaud and F. H. Bostem for the FOCAL-69 version of the language, and a 1978 catalog adds Ruben by James R. B. Howard II and Jimmie B. Fletcher, "a modification of the 'King of Sumeria' game" with additional features. The French version of the game, however, despite being listed as "Sumer (French)", described itself not as a translation of the original game, but as a translation of "Hamurabi (The Sumer Game)", due to another version of the game which was already released by then.

In 1970, DEC employee David H. Ahl was working in the educational sales department and found that customers outside DEC's Boston-area home were uninterested in using FOCAL. He hired a Brooklyn programmer to write a version of BASIC for the PDP-8. Around 1971, he ported a version of The Sumer Game to BASIC and published it in DEC's educational newsletter, Edu. The new version was renamed Hamurabi and added an end-of-game performance appraisal, based on a similar concept in James A. Storer's The Pollution Game (1970). Unlike FOCAL, BASIC was widely available on many platforms and the new version was soon found on many of them. In 1973 he re-published the game—as well as The Pollution Game, as King—as part of the collection in 101 BASIC Computer Games, which became a best-seller with over 10,000 copies sold.

In 1975 the Altair 8800 was released, and soon after, Altair BASIC. The microcomputer revolution followed, and BASIC was the standard language on these machines. Ahl re-published his book once again, this time under the title BASIC Computer Games, which became the best selling computer book of the time, with over a million copies sold. The popularity of both the book and the programming language itself meant that Ahl's version of the game became the more widely known version over the relatively obscure original, as evidenced by the 1973 French FOCAL version considering "Hamurabi" to be the more prominent name.

BASIC Computer Games noted that the game was a modification of a game "written in FOCAL at DEC", but listed the author as "unknown". The 1978 edition of the book, which was the first million-selling computer book, noted that the game's name was intended to be "Hammurabi", but not only was one "m" dropped in the file name to fit in an eight-character limit, but Ahl consistently misspelled the name inside of the game, following Dyment's spelling, leading to the generally accepted name of the game to be Hamurabi.

== Legacy ==
In addition to the multiple versions of Hamurabi, several simulation games have been created as expansions of the core game. These include King, a.k.a. The Pollution Game (1970) by James A. Storer, and Kingdom by Lee Schneider and Todd Voros, written for mainframe computers in 1972 and in BASIC in 1975, which was then expanded to Dukedom (1976). Other derivations include Santa Paravia en Fiumaccio (1978) by George Blank; Santa Paravia added the concept of city building management to the basic structure of Hamurabi, making it an antecedent to the city-building genre as well as an early strategy game. A conversion of this game was included on the BBC Micro's Welcome Tape and Welcome Disc as Yellow River Kingdom (1981). Hamurabi inspired more complicated economic simulation games; M.U.L.E. (1983) and Anacreon (1987) are two games that critics mentioned as being similar to Hamurabi.
