= Simulation video game =

Video game genre

Simulation video games, also abbreviated as "sims", are a diverse super-category of video games, generally designed to closely simulate real world activities. A simulation game attempts to copy various activities from real life in the form of a game for various purposes such as training, analysis, prediction, or entertainment.

Usually, there are no strictly defined goals in the game, and the player is allowed to control a character or environment freely.

Well-known examples of simulation games are war games, business games, and role play simulation. From three basic types of strategic, planning, and learning exercises: games, simulations, and case studies, a number of hybrids may be considered, including simulation games that are used as case studies.

Comparisons of the merits of simulation games versus other teaching techniques have been carried out by many researchers and a number of comprehensive reviews have been published.

== Subgenres ==
=== Construction and management simulation ===
Construction and management simulation (CMS) is a type of simulation game in which players build, expand or manage fictional communities or projects with limited resources. Strategy games sometimes incorporate CMS aspects into their game economy, as players must manage resources while expanding their projects. Pure CMS games differ from strategy games in that "the player's goal is not to defeat an enemy, but to build something within the context of an ongoing process." Games in this category are sometimes also called "management games".

=== Life simulation ===
Life simulation games (or artificial life games) are a subgenre of simulation video games in which the player lives or controls one or more artificial lifeforms. A life simulation game can revolve around "individuals and relationships, or it could be a simulation of an ecosystem". Social simulation games are one of its subgenres such as The Sims.

=== Sports ===
Some video games simulate the playing of sports. Most sports have been recreated by video games, including team sports, athletics and extreme sports. Some games emphasize playing the sport (such as the Madden NFL series), whilst others emphasize strategy and organization (such as Football Manager). Some, such as Arch Rivals, satirize the sport for comic effect. This genre has been popular throughout the history of video games, and is competitive, just like real-world sports. A number of game series feature the names and characteristics of real teams and players, and are updated continuously to reflect real-world changes.

=== Other types ===
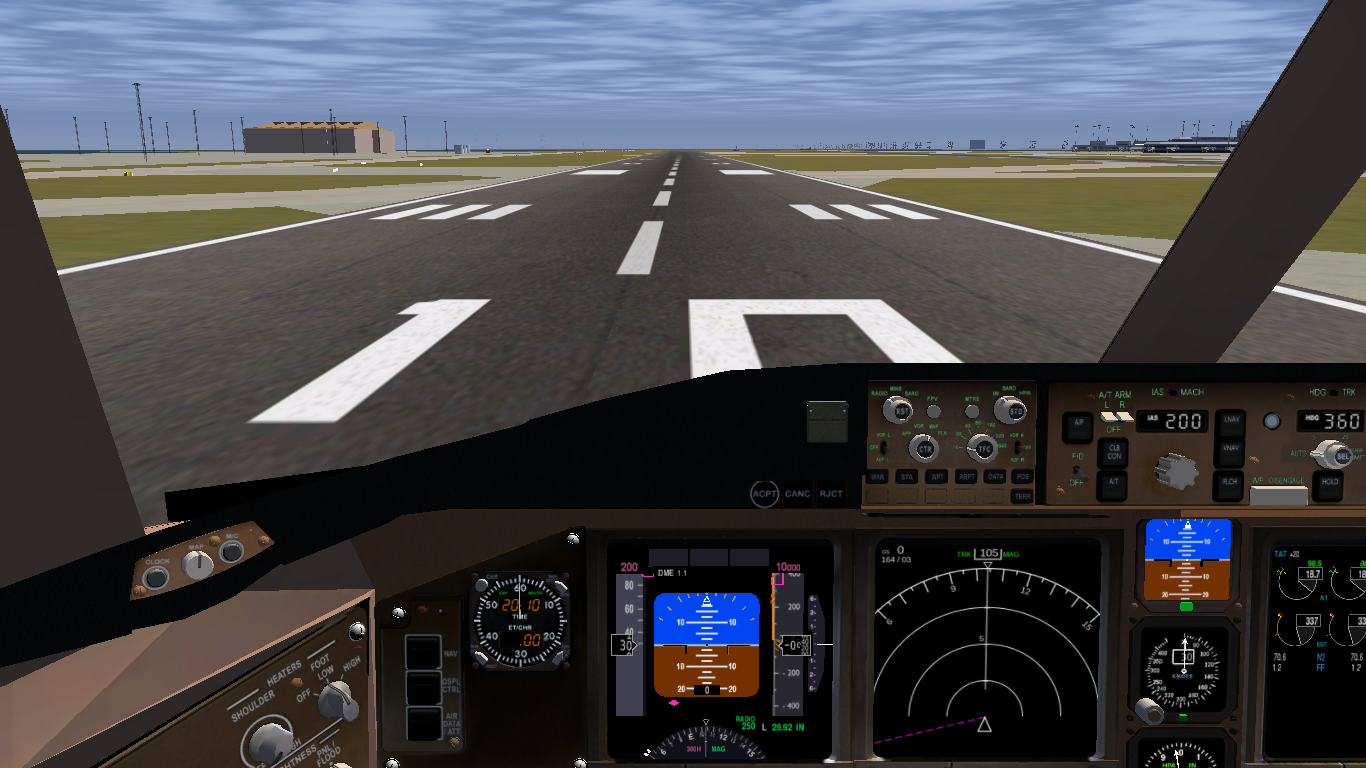
FlightGear, a flight simulator video game

- In medical simulation games, the player takes the role of a surgeon. Examples include the Trauma Center and LifeSigns series.
- In photography simulation games, players take photographs of animals or people. This includes games such as Pokémon Snap and Afrika.
- In police simulation games, the player takes the role of law enforcement. Examples include the LCPDFR and LSPDFR and the Cops and Robbers V server for FiveM.
- Military simulation games are wargames with higher degrees of realism than other wargames set in a fantasy or science fiction environment. These attempt to simulate real warfare at either a tactical or strategic level.
  - Some simulators, like GeoCommander by Intelligence Gaming, are designed for the US military to help new officers learn how to handle situations in a game setting before taking command in the field.
  - Certain tactical shooters have higher degrees of realism than other shooters. Sometimes called "soldier sims", these games try to simulate the feeling of being in combat. This includes games such as Arma.

Gravity simulator game. The player can launch the Sun and planets, turn on the trail, set the initial speed.

- Vehicle simulation game
  - Flight simulators, including amateur flight simulators, combat flight simulators and space flight simulators
  - Racing video games, including sim racing
  - Submarine simulator games
  - Train simulator games
  - Truck simulator games
- Immersive sims are typically played from the first-person perspective and set in a simulation of a consistent lived-in world, and include elements of numerous gameplay systems that the player can use to complete objectives through many different methods, creating a sense of player agency and emergent gameplay.
- Job simulation games that include both realistic and hyper-realistic presentation of blue collar jobs in a game setting. These can include some of the vehicle simulation games including the flight, train and truck simulator titles, hunting games like TheHunter series, other job simulation games like House Flipper or PowerWash Simulator, and games themed around these types of jobs like Overcooked.
- Digital card games simulating blackjack and poker (including video poker)
- Video games designed to simulate mechanical or other real-world games. These may include simulations of pinball games and casino games such as slot machines, pachinko, and roulette.

== Simulation games in education ==
Because Simulation games make learning a matter of direct experience, they may relieve the tedium associated with more conventional modes of instruction, as they demand increased participation rather than merely reading about or discussing concepts and ideas (like discrimination, culture, stratification, and norms). Students will experience them by actually ''living" the experiences. Therefore, the use of simulation games may increase students' motivation and interest in learning.

Simulation games can provide increased insights into how the world is seen, like the moral and intellectual idiosyncrasies of others. They may also increase empathy for others and help develop awareness of personal and interpersonal values by allowing players to see moral and ethical implications of the choices they make. As such, they can be used to change and improve students attitudes toward self, environment, and classroom learning.

Many games are designed to change and develop specific skills of decision making, problem solving and critical thinking (such as those involved in survey sampling, perception and communication).

== History ==
The Sumerian Game (1964), a text-based early mainframe game designed by Mabel Addis, based on the ancient Sumerian city-state of Lagash, was the first economic simulation game. In 1968, Cornell University funded several simulation games which were developed by Prof. Robert Chase and his students. These included Cornell Hotel Administration Simulation Exercise and Cornell Restaurant Administration Simulation Exercise. Notably the restaurant game featured competitive play, with teams managing competing restaurants. The games drew attention from the relevant industries of the time and were made playable at national conventions for the American Hotel & Motel Association and the Club Managers Association of America in 1969.

Another early economic sim by Danielle Bunten Berry, M.U.L.E., released in 1983.

In the 1980s, it became a trend for arcade video games to use hydraulic motion simulator arcade cabinets. The trend was sparked by Sega's "taikan" games, with "taikan" meaning "body sensation" in Japanese. Sega's first game to use a motion simulator cabinet was Space Tactics (1981), a space combat simulator that had a cockpit cabinet where the screen moved in sync with the on-screen action. The "taikan" trend later began when Yu Suzuki's team at Sega (later known as Sega AM2) developed Hang-On (1985), a racing video game where the player sits on and moves a motorbike replica to control the in-game actions. Suzuki's team at Sega followed it with hydraulic motion simulator cockpit cabinets for rail shooters such as Space Harrier (1985), racing games such as Out Run (1986), and combat flight simulators such as After Burner (1987) and G-LOC: Air Battle (1990). One of the most sophisticated motion simulator cabinets in arcades was Sega's R360 (1990), which simulated the full 360-degree rotation of an aircraft. Sega have since continued to manufacture motion simulator cabinets for arcade games through to the 2010s.

In the mid-1980s, Codemasters and the Oliver Twins released a number of games with "Simulator" in the title, including BMX Simulator (1986), Grand Prix Simulator (1986), and Pro Boxing Simulator (1988). Richard and David Darling of Codemasters were inspired by Concertmaster's best-selling games, which were based on real sports such as football and BMX racing, which had a pre-existing popularity. In a parody of the established "simulator" cliche, Your Sinclair released a game titled Advanced Lawnmower Simulator in 1988.

The introduction of the city-building simulation subgenre is closely associated with the 1989 release of SimCity by developer Will Wright. However, earlier city-building titles had been published, including the 1984 Colecovision title Fortune Builder. Later games published by Wright's company Maxis, including SimLife and SimEarth, simulated worlds at a broader scale, including recreations of genetics and global ecosystems.

A study of adolescents who played SimCity 2000 found that those players had a greater appreciation and expectation of their government officials after playing.

== See also ==
- Game classification
- List of simulation games
- Serious game
- Simming
- Simulated reality
- Simulation
- Tabletop game
