= Cutscene =

Sequence in a video game that is not interactive, breaking up the gameplay

A cutscene in the original Pac-Man game exaggerated the effect of the Energizer power pellet power-up.

A cutscene or event scene (sometimes in-game cinematic or in-game movie) is a sequence in a video game that is not interactive, interrupting the gameplay. Such scenes are used to show conversations between characters, set the mood, reward the player, introduce newer models and gameplay elements, show the effects of a player's actions, create emotional connections, improve pacing or foreshadow future events.

Cutscenes often feature "on the fly" rendering, using the gameplay graphics to create scripted events. Cutscenes can also be pre-rendered computer graphics streamed from a video file. Pre-made videos used in video games (either during cutscenes or during the gameplay itself) are referred to as "full-motion videos" or "FMVs". Cutscenes can also appear in other forms, such as a series of images or as plain text and audio.

== History ==
The Sumerian Game (1966), an early mainframe game designed by Mabel Addis, introduced its Sumerian setting with a slideshow synchronized to an audio recording; it was essentially an unskippable introductory cutscene, but not an in-game cutscene. Taito's arcade video game Space Invaders Part II (1979) introduced the use of brief comical intermission scenes between levels, where the last invader who gets shot limps off screen. Namco's Pac-Man (1980) similarly featured cutscenes in the form of brief comical interludes, about Pac-Man and Blinky chasing each other.

Shigeru Miyamoto's Donkey Kong (1981) took the cutscene concept a step further by using cutscenes to visually advance a complete story. Data East's laserdisc video game Bega's Battle (1983) introduced animated full-motion video (FMV) cutscenes with voice acting to develop a story between the game's shooting stages, which became the standard approach to game storytelling years later. The games Bugaboo (The Flea) in 1983 and Karateka (1984) helped introduce the cutscene concept to home computers.

In the point-and-click adventure genre, Ron Gilbert introduced the cutscene concept with non-interactive plot sequences in Maniac Mansion (1987), with the game's manual being the earliest known usage of the term 'cut-scene'. Tecmo's Ninja Gaiden for the Famicom in 1988 and NES the following year featured over 20 minutes of anime-like "cinema scenes" that helped tell an elaborate story. In addition to an introduction and ending, the cutscenes were intertwined between stages and gradually revealed the plot to the player. The use of animation or full-screen graphics was limited, consisting mostly of still illustrations with sound effects and dialogue written underneath; however the game employed rather sophisticated shots such as low camera angles and close-ups, as well as widescreen letterboxing, to create a movie-like experience.

Other early video games known to use cutscenes extensively include The Portopia Serial Murder Case in 1983; Valis in 1986; Phantasy Star and La Abadía del Crimen in 1987; Ys II: Ancient Ys Vanished – The Final Chapter, and Prince of Persia and Zero Wing in 1989. Since then, cutscenes have been part of many video games, especially in action-adventure and role-playing video games.

Cutscenes became much more common with the rise of CD-ROM as the primary storage medium for video games, as its much greater storage space allowed developers to use more cinematically impressive media such as FMV and high-quality voice tracks.

== Types ==
=== Live-action cutscenes ===
Live-action cutscenes have many similarities to films. For example, the cutscenes in Wing Commander IV used both fully constructed sets, and well known actors such as Mark Hamill and Malcolm McDowell for the portrayal of characters.

Some movie tie-in games, such as Electronic Arts' The Lord of the Rings and Star Wars games, have also extensively used film footage and other assets from the film production in their cutscenes. Another movie tie-in, Enter the Matrix, used film footage shot concurrently with The Matrix Reloaded that was also directed by the film's directors, the Wachowskis. In the DreamWorks Interactive (now known as Danger Close Games) 1996 point and click title, The Neverhood Chronicles, full motion video cutscenes were made using the animation technique of stop motion and puppets sculpted out of plasticine, much like the game’s actual worlds and characters. The game’s creator, Douglas TenNapel was in charge of filming the cutscenes, as stated in the game’s behind the scenes video.

=== Pre-rendered cutscenes ===
Pre-rendered cutscenes are animated and rendered by the game's developers, and take advantage of the full array of techniques of CGI, cel animation or graphic novel-style panel art. Like live-action shoots, pre-rendered cutscenes are often presented in full motion video.

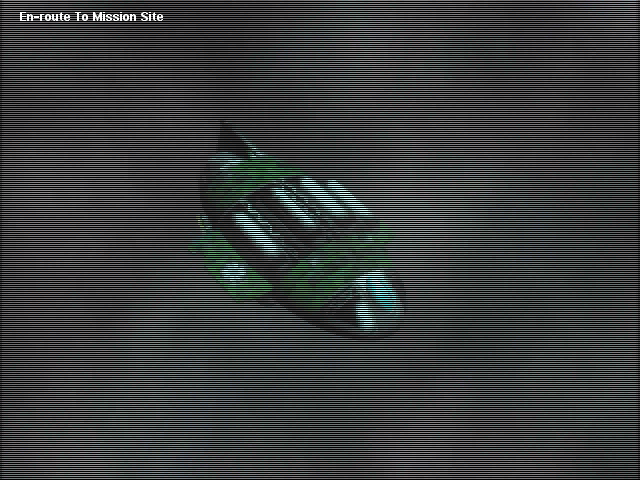
Screenshot of a pre-rendered cutscene from Warzone 2100, a free and open-source video game

=== Real time cutscenes ===
Real time cutscenes are rendered on-the-fly using the same game engine as the graphics during gameplay. This technique is also known as Machinima.

Real time cutscenes are generally of much lower detail and visual quality than pre-rendered cutscenes, but can adapt to the state of the game. For example, some games allow the player character to wear several different outfits, and appear in cutscenes wearing the outfit the player has chosen, as seen in Super Mario Odyssey, The Legend of Zelda: Breath of the Wild and Grand Theft Auto: San Andreas. It is also possible to give the player control over camera movement during real time cutscenes, as seen in Dungeon Siege, Metal Gear Solid 2: Sons of Liberty, Halo: Reach, and Kane & Lynch: Dead Men.

=== Mixed media cutscenes ===
Many games use both pre-rendered and real time cutscenes as the developer feels is appropriate for each scene.

During the 1990s in particular, it was common for the techniques of live action, pre-rendering, and real time rendering to be combined in a single cutscene. For example, popular games such as Myst, Wing Commander III, and Phantasmagoria use film of live actors superimposed upon pre-rendered animated backgrounds for their cutscenes. Though Final Fantasy VII primarily uses real-time cutscenes, it has several scenes in which real-time graphics are combined with pre-rendered full motion video. Though rarer than the other two possible combinations, the pairing of live action video with real time graphics is seen in games such as Killing Time.

=== Interactive cutscenes ===
Interactive cutscenes involve the computer taking control of the player character while prompts (such as a sequence of button presses) appear onscreen, requiring the player to follow them in order to continue or succeed at the action. This gameplay mechanic, commonly called quick time events, has its origins in interactive movie laserdisc video games such as Dragon's Lair, Road Blaster, and Space Ace.

== Criticism ==
Director Steven Spielberg, director Guillermo del Toro, and game designer Ken Levine, all of whom are avid video gamers, criticized the use of cutscenes in games, calling them intrusive. Spielberg states that making the story flow naturally into the gameplay is a challenge for future game developers. Hollywood writer Danny Bilson called cinematics the "last resort of game storytelling", as a person doesn't want to watch a movie when they are playing a video game. Game designer Raph Koster criticized cutscenes as being the part that has "the largest possibility for emotional engagement, for art dare we say", while also being the bit that can be cut with no impact on the actual gameplay. Koster claims that because of this, many of the memorable peak emotional moments in video games are actually not given by the game itself at all. It is a common criticism that cutscenes simply belong to a different medium.

Others think of cutscenes as another tool designers can use to make engrossing video games. An article on GameFront calls upon a number of successful video games that make excessive use of cutscenes for storytelling purposes, referring to cutscenes as a highly effective way to communicate a storyteller's vision. Rune Klevjer states: "A cutscene does not cut off gameplay. It is an integral part of the configurative experience", saying that they will always affect the rhythm of a game, but if they are well implemented, cutscenes can be an excellent tool for building suspense or providing the player with helpful or crucial visual information.

== See also ==
- Interactive movie – Interactive media genre
- Machinima – Film production in graphics engines
