= Video Trek 88 =

1982 video game

- Developer(s): Windmill Software
- Publisher(s): Windmill Software
- Series: Star Trek
- Platform(s): DOS
- Release: 1982
- Mode(s): Single-player

Video Trek 88 is a computer game developed and published by Windmill Software in 1982, based on the earlier Star Trek text game. As opposed to the mainframe version, both the galactic chart and the local map are displayed side by side.

A game in progress

The game is suitable for monochrome or color adapters, but is best viewed in monochrome. It was one of Windmill Software's earliest games, written in the BASIC programming language (specifically, BASICA) and requires an interpreter such as GW-BASIC to be executed.
