= Santa Paravia en Fiumaccio =

1978 video game

Santa Paravia and Fiumaccio
- Designer: George Blank
- Platforms: TRS-80, TI-99/4A, Apple II, PET, Atari 8-bit, Amiga, Atari ST, Commodore 64/128, MS-DOS
- Release: 1978
- Genre: City-building
- Modes: Single-player, multiplayer

Santa Paravia en Fiumaccio is a video game in which each player becomes the ruler of a fledgling Italian city-state around the year 1400. The goal of the game is to become king or queen; to do so the player must manage their city-state so that it may grow.

The game, by George Blank, first appeared in the December 1978 issue of SoftSide magazine, (Milford, NH), and was published for sale on tape cassette as a computer game by Instant Software (Peterborough, NH) for the Radio Shack TRS-80, Apple II, TI-99/4A, and Commodore PET. It has been translated into many languages, such as ANSI C, and has been ported to the Palm`Pilot.

== Gameplay ==
Santa Paravia is a kingdom‑management game in which the player advances through ranks of royalty by overseeing land, grain, population, and treasury; each turn the player buys or sells grain and land, releases grain to peasants to influence population and starvation, and sets customs, income tax, tariffs, and justice. Seasonal sowing and harvest depend on grain reserves, weather, and rats, while income allows the player to purchase marketplaces, mills, palaces, cathedrals, and soldiers. As the realm grows, merchants, clergy, nobles, and higher status appear, but mills and merchants require peasants to operate, and all economic and social factors interact in complex, irreversible ways.

== Reception ==
All Game Guide called Santa Paravia and Fiumaccio an enjoyable and entertaining strategy game. Moves liked the graphic dsplay in Santa Paravia en Fiumaccio.

== See also ==
- Dukedom, a 1976 fief management game
- Dynasty, a 1978 province management game set in the Hunan under the Yuan dynasty
- Hamurabi, a 1968 city management game
