= BASIC Computer Games =

1973 book of computer programs

- Cover of the 1973 edition
- Author: David H. Ahl
- Cover artist: Bob Barner
- Subject: Computer programming
- Publication date: 1973

BASIC Computer Games is a compilation of type-in computer games in the BASIC programming language collected by David H. Ahl. Some of the games were written or modified by Ahl as well. Among its better-known games are Hamurabi and Super Star Trek.

Originally published by DEC in 1973 as 101 BASIC Computer Games, the book was so popular that it had two more printing runs, the last in March 1975. The programs in these books were mostly written in the BASIC dialect found on Digital's minicomputers, although some could not be converted and appeared in different dialects like Dartmouth BASIC.

In 1974, Ahl left DEC. He purchased the rights to the book and republished it under the new name. With the release of the first microcomputers, and Microsoft BASIC soon after, the collection added several new games, removed some, and those that remained from the original were ported to this dialect. By the early 1980s, with tens of millions of home computers in the market, it had become the first computer book to sell a million copies.

== History ==
Around 1971, Ahl ported two popular early mainframe games from DEC's FOCAL language to BASIC: Hamurabi and Lunar Lander. He published the BASIC versions in DEC's educational newsletter, EDU, which he edited. Their popularity was such that he called for more submissions for future editions of the newsletter, and quickly gathered many, with a considerable group of them coming from high school students.

The wide availability of BASIC on various platforms, notably the Data General Nova and HP 2100 series, led to considerable porting effort to and from the DEC platform. In July 1973, Ahl published a selection of these submissions as 101 BASIC Computer Games, which quickly sold out. This led to two further printing runs in April 1974 and March 1975. Ahl later noted that number "was far more books than there were computers around, so people were buying three, four, five of them for each computer."

In 1974, Ahl left DEC to start Creative Computing magazine. The next year saw the launch of the first microcomputers and 101 became quite popular with the owners of these machines. The release of the "1977 Trinity" machines (Apple II, Commodore PET, and TRS-80) was soon followed by a great many new competing microcomputer platforms featuring BASIC, along with the userbase to go with them, and demand for the book led to a second edition in 1978. This version removed non-DEC games, replaced them with some of the many submissions he had over the years, and ported those that remained into MS-BASIC format. By 1979, it had sold over 1 million copies, the first computer book to do so.

Sales remained strong for years, and spawned similar collections in More Basic Computer Games (1979), and Big Computer Games (1984) and Basic Computer Adventures (1984), with translations into six languages.

== Games ==
- Chomp
- Civil War
- Hexapawn
- Hammurabi (based on The Sumer Game by Doug Dyment)
- Nim
- Super Star Trek

== Reception ==
The first version, 101 went into a second printing and eventually sold 10,000 copies. Ahl later noted that “was far more books than there were computers around, so people were buying three, four, five of them for each computer.”

The second version, BASIC, was re-printed many times and was the first computer book to sell a million copies. Harry McCracken called it "The single most influential book of the BASIC era".

== Legacy ==
Using Vintage Basic, the games can be run on Microsoft Windows, macOS, and Linux. The source code for the book is provided (with permission of David H Ahl) on the Vintage Basic's Basic Computer Games page.

A Microsoft Windows machine with the GW-BASIC interpreter can also run the games.

The games are also compilable and playable with the Microsoft Small Basic development environment for children. Computer Science for Kids has released a 2010 Small Basic Edition of the classic Basic Computer Games book called Basic Computer Games: Small Basic Edition.

A project started on GitHub in 2021 to port the games in these books to modern languages.

Program listings from the second ("microcomputer") edition, and from More Basic Computer Games, can be run by the open-source Brassica interpreter in R or Python.

With the BASIC to Javascript compiler, the original 101 games can be run in a web browser.
