= Dukedom (video game) =

1976 video game

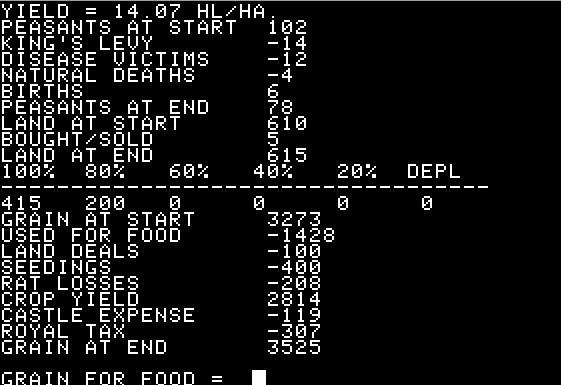
- Developer(s): Vince Talbot
- Platform(s): PL/1, Personal computer
- Release: 1976
- Genre(s): Turn-based strategy

Dukedom is a turn-based strategy text-based video game about land management and was created as an expanded version of Hamurabi.

== Gameplay ==
The player is one of several Dukes chosen by the High King to help run the Kingdom. Their Duchy is not in the best of shape, the gameplay goal is to build up its population, land holdings, and grain reserves, ultimately hoping to become powerful enough to overthrow the High King.

The player has to manage their duchy, while paying taxes and sending, on occasion, peasants to the King's service, undergoing epidemics, locusts and rival lords secretly helped by the High King; they can buy and sell land, itself divided in several categories depending on fertility, and engaging in offensive or defensive warfare, sending both subjects and mercenaries against the enemy and winning land and grain.

== Development ==
Dukedom was written in PL/I D by Vince Talbot in 1976 as an expanded version of Kingdom, which itself is an expanded version of Hamurabi. The game was rewritten (with extensive revision) in I.T.S. EXBASIC by Jamie E. Hanrahan. It was adapted for /GAMES/ by David C. Barber. It was re-written from I.T.S. EXBASIC to Hewlett-Packard level F BASIC then to DEC RSTS/E BASIC-PLUS.

The game was converted to Microsoft BASIC by Richard A. Kaapke. The BASIC version appeared in Creative Computing in February 1980 and was republished in Big Computer Games (1984).

A Small Basic version called Dukedom Small Basic Version exists in source code form on GitHub.

A complete Python version is also available on GitHub.

It inspired the game Manor, which purported to be more historically accurate.
