= Mabel Addis =

First woman computer games designer

- Born: Mabel Holmes; May 21, 1912; Mount Vernon, New York, U.S
- Died: August 13, 2004 (aged 92); Purdys, New York, U.S.
- Education: Barnard College; Columbia University
- Notable work: The Sumerian Game

Mabel Addis Mergardt (21 May 1912 – 13 August 2004) was an American writer, teacher and the first video game writer. She designed The Sumerian Game, programmed by William McKay, for the IBM 7090 in 1964, which inspired other kingdom management games such as Hamurabi from the early 1970s. She is considered to have created the strategy video game genre and text based game concept. She has been recognized as the world's first narrative video game writer as well as the first video game writer, and is the oldest known female video game designer.

== Early life and education ==
Mabel Holmes was born on 21 May 1912 to James Holmes and Mabel Wood. She grew up in Mount Vernon and excelled in school, graduating valedictorian from Brewster High School in 1929. After graduating, she attended Barnard College. At Barnard, she obtained a degree in ancient history and a minor in psychology by 1933. She attended Columbia University for her graduate schooling, and obtained a master's degree in education.

== Career ==
Upon obtaining her master’s degree in education, Addis worked in a rural one-room school. In 1937, she moved to the Hyatt Avenue School. She worked there for thirteen years before finally moving to Katonah-Lewisboro School District in 1950. She taught in this district until 1976. Her teaching career spanned five decades.

Addis was active in her community. She used her knowledge of history to contribute to both history and book committees in the school district. As a member of the Somers historical society, she wrote and published historical articles, started an oral history collection, and contributed to Frances Riker Duncombe's Katonah: The History of a New York Village and its People (1961) and perhaps Abba L. Howe's Brewster Through the Years (1948).

Her most notable work took place in the 1960s. Addis was elected to work with IBM and Boards of Cooperative Educational Services to create The Sumerian Game, the first text-based computer game. This game enabled players to assume the roles of rulers of the ancient Sumerian city of Lagash, marking it as the first video game to run on a fully electronic computer. As a result, Addis became the first writer and designer for computer video games, pioneering the field.

== Personal life and legacy ==
She married Alexander L. Addis in 1942, officially becoming Mabel Addis. Alexander died in 1981. She remarried in 1991 to Gerard Mergardt, who died in 1995.

Addis died in 2004. She was posthumously awarded the Pioneer Award during the 2023 edition of Game Developers Conference on 23 February 2023.
