= Richard Merrill (computer scientist) =

American computer scientist

Richard Merrill was a Digital Equipment Corporation employee who invented the FOCAL programming language and programmed the first two interpreters for the language in 1968 and 1969, for the PDP-8. He also developed later versions of the interpreter for the PDP-7 and PDP-9, later ported it to the PDP-11.

Merrill also designed and programmed the EDIT-8 text editor (using paper-tape).

Rick Merrill is an alumnus of Episcopal High School, a preparatory school in Alexandria, VA and of M.I.T BS'63 MS'65 and Clark University MBA'85
