= Text-based game =

Video game that uses text characters

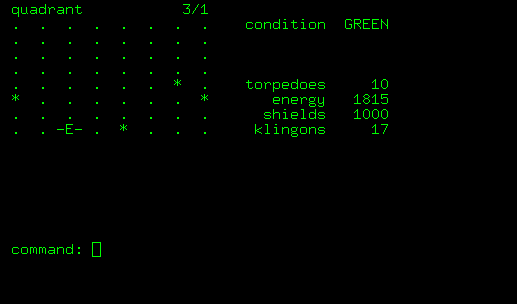
Interface of the 1971 text-based Star Trek game

A text game or text-based game is an electronic game that uses a text-based user interface, that is, the user interface employs a set of encodable characters, such as ASCII, instead of bitmap or vector graphics.

Text-based games have been well documented since at least the 1960s, when teleprinters were interlaced with mainframe computers as a form of input, where the output was printed on paper. With that, notable titles were developed for those computers using the sprinter in the 1960s and 1970s and more numerous game titles have been developed for other video terminals since at least the mid-1970s, having reached their peak popularity in that decade and the 1980s, and continued as early online games into the mid-1990s.

Although generally replaced in favor of video games that use non-textual graphics, text-based games continue to be written by independent developers. They have been the basis of instigating genres of video gaming, especially adventure and role-playing video games.

== Overview ==
Strictly speaking, text-based means employing an encoding system of characters designed to be printable as text data. As most computers only read binary code, encoding formats are typically written in such, where a bit is the smallest unit of data that has two possible values and each combination of bits represents a byte. That said, a text-based game is any electronic game whereby information is conveyed as encoded text in the user interface.

Although technically graphical when displayed on a computer monitor, text data is sometimes contrasted with graphics as the former is text-only; data representation conveyed via an output device is restricted to a given set of encodable characters and the total number thereof, as well as graphical capabilities. For example, ASCII uses 96 printable characters in its set of 128, whereas ANSI uses both ASCII and 128 additional characters from extended ASCII and allows the text to be variously colored, allowing for further possibilities. Text data also has the advantage of requiring small processing power and minimal graphical capabilities by modern standards, as well as significantly reducing production costs compared to graphical data.

== History ==
Text-based games trace as far back as teleprinters in the 1960s, when they were installed on early mainframe computers as an input-and-output form. At that time, video terminals were expensive and being experimented as "glass teletypes", and the user would submit commands via the teleprinter interfaced with the mainframe, the output being printed on paper. Notable early mainframe games include The Sumerian Game, Lunar Lander, The Oregon Trail, and Star Trek.

In the mid-1970s, when video terminals became the cheapest means for multiple users to interact with mainframes, text-based games were designed in universities for mainframes partly as an experiment on artificial intelligence, the majority of these games being either based on the 1974 role-playing game Dungeons & Dragons or inspired by J. R. R. Tolkien's works. As with other games, they often lacked functionalities such as saving. Proposed reasons for the absence of the ability to save included the fact that early computer games were often simple and gaming sessions were brief, as well as hardware limitations and costs. This may partly explain why earlier computer games were developed instead under the episodic structure, but such computer games whose source code could be accessed by anyone could be modified, and as designers wrote larger game worlds, gaming sessions lengthened, and the need to resume where left off became inevitable. This started in 1977 with Don Woods' revision of the 1976 text-based adventure game Colossal Cave Adventure (later renamed to Adventure), which saw expanded gameplay and story and, notably, the ability to save.

Text-based games were also early forerunners to online gaming. From the late-1970s until the worldwide dominance of the Internet in the mid-1990s, home computer users could still interact remotely with other computers by using dial-up modems, connecting them via telephone wires. These computers were often directed via text-based terminal emulators to hobbyist-run bulletin board systems (BBSes), which tended to be accessible—often freely—by area codes to cut costs from more distant communications. Without a graphical program for clients, most online computer games could only run using textual graphics, and where the user did have such a program, the often limited bandwidth of the modem made downloading graphics much slower than text. Online games designed for BBSes initially used ASCII as the character set, but since the late-1980s, most BBSes employed colored ANSI art as the graphical standard. These online games became known as "BBS door games", as connecting to a BBS opened the "door" between the client and the games on the BBS.

However, terminal emulators are still in use today, and people continue playing MUDs (multi-user dungeon) and exploring interactive fiction. The Interactive Fiction Competition was established in 1995 to encourage development of and explore independent interactive fiction titles, and has since held annual competitions for who can develop the best such game.

== Genres ==
Although text-based games are not limited to any specific genre, several notable genres started as and were popularized by text-based games.

=== Text adventure ===
Text adventures (sometimes synonymously referred to as interactive fiction) are text-based games wherein worlds are described in the narrative and the player submits typically simple commands to interact with the worlds. Colossal Cave Adventure is considered to be the first adventure game, and indeed the name of the genre adventure game is derived from the title. As text-based adventure games reached their peak in popularity in the late 1970s and 1980s, notable text-based adventure titles were released by various developers, including Zork and The Hitchhiker's Guide to the Galaxy by Infocom.

=== MUD ===
An MUD (originally Multi-user dungeon, with later variants Multi-User Dimension and Multi-User Domain), is a multi-user real-time online virtual world. Most MUDs are represented entirely in text, but graphical MUDs are not unknown. MUDs combine elements of role-playing games, hack and slash, interactive fiction, and online chat. Players can read or view depictions of rooms, objects, other players, non-player characters, and actions performed in the virtual world. Players typically interact with each other and the world by typing commands that resemble a natural language.

=== Roguelike ===
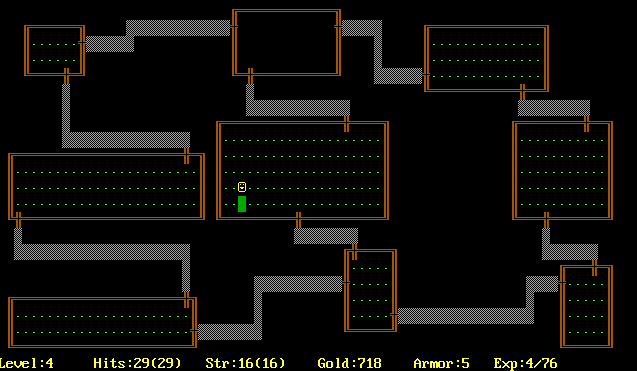
A procedurally generated dungeon in Rogue, a 1980 text-based video game that spawned the roguelike genre

The roguelike is a subgenre of role-playing video games, characterized by randomization for replayability, permanent death, and turn-based movement. Many early roguelikes featured ASCII graphics. Games are typically dungeon crawls, with many monsters, items, and environmental features. Computer roguelikes usually employ the majority of the keyboard to facilitate interaction with items and the environment. The name of the genre comes from the 1980 game Rogue.

== See also ==
- ASCII art
- List of text-based computer games
- Online text-based role-playing game
