= David H. Ahl =

American author

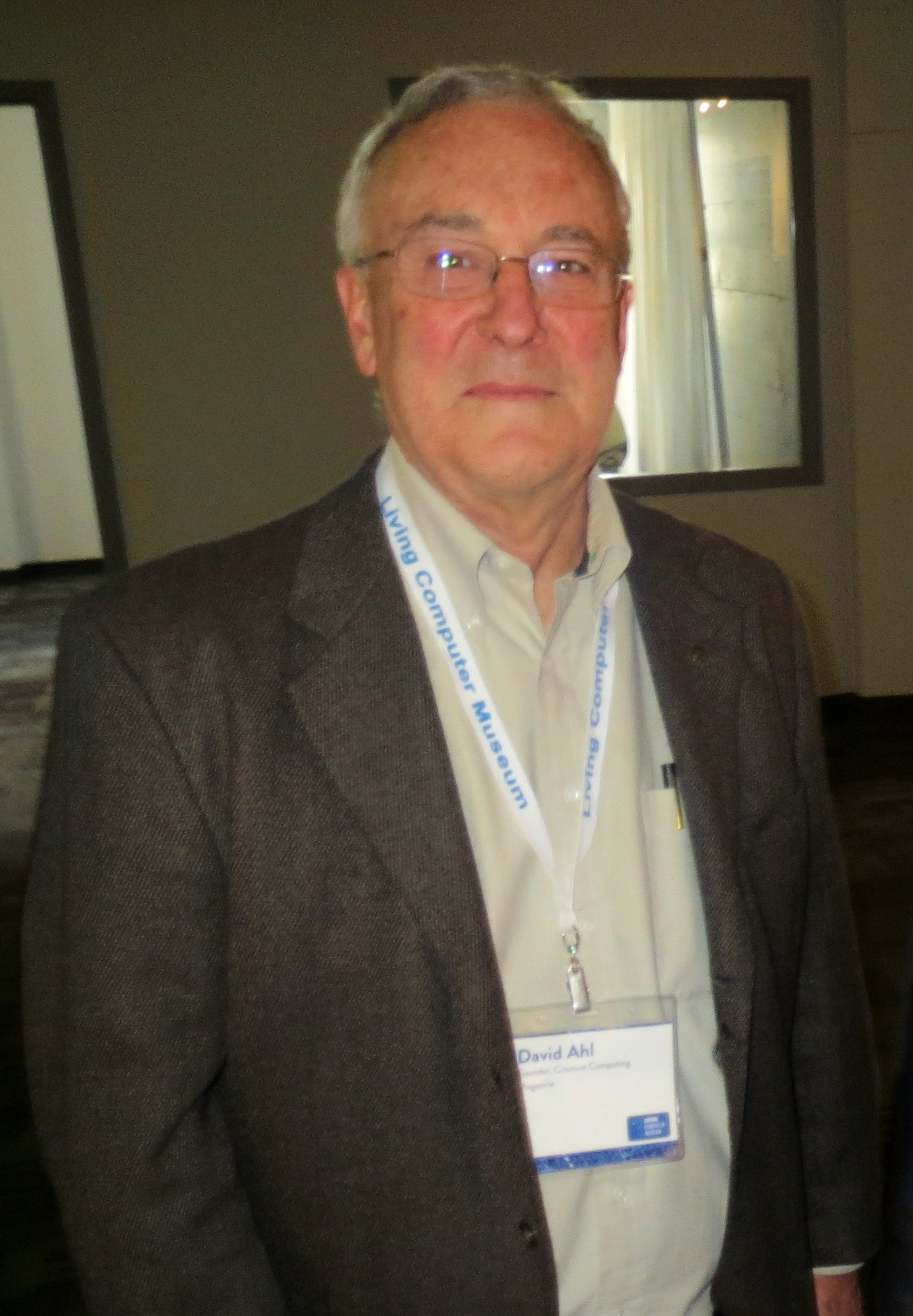
- Ahl at the Living Computer Museum in 2013
- Born: May 17, 1939
- Occupation: Author

David H. Ahl (born May 17, 1939) is an American author who is the founder of Creative Computing magazine. He is also the author of many how-to books, including BASIC Computer Games, the first computer book to sell more than a million copies.

== Career ==
After earning degrees in electrical engineering and business administration, while completing his Ph.D. in educational psychology, Ahl was hired by Digital Equipment Corporation as a marketing consultant in 1969 to develop its educational products line. He edited EDU, DEC's newsletter on educational uses of computers, that regularly published instructions for playing computer games on minicomputers. Ahl also talked DEC into publishing a book he had put together, 101 BASIC Computer Games. During the 1973 recession, DEC cut back on educational product development and Ahl was dismissed.

Before he even received his last cheque, he was rehired into a DEC division dedicated to developing new hardware. This group became caught up in building a computer that was smaller than any yet built, intending to bring the new product into new markets such as schools. DEC built a machine combining a PDP-8 with a VT50 terminal, and another that crammed a PDP-11 into a small portable chassis. When it was presented to DEC's Operations Committee, the engineering side loved it but the sales side was worried it would cut into the sales of their existing lines. The decision ultimately fell to Ken Olsen, who finally stated that "I can't see any reason that anyone would want a computer of his own." With that, the project was dead.

Frustrated, Ahl left DEC in 1974, and started Creative Computing, one of the earliest magazines covering the microcomputer revolution. For the next decade Creative Computing covered the whole spectrum of hobbyist, home, and personal computing, and although Ahl sold the publication to Ziff Davis in the early 1980s, he continued in his capacity as Editor-in-Chief.

After the end of Creative Computing he published Atari Explorer and Atarian magazines for Atari as well as non-Computer-related magazines and newsletters.

In 2010, David Ahl helped re-publish a Special 25th and 30th Anniversary Edition of two of his classic programming books, specifically for a new development environment for beginners, called Microsoft Small Basic.

In June 2022, Ahl released everything he had ever written, from prose to software, into the public domain.
