= List of Commodore PET games =

This is a list of Commodore PET games. See Lists of video games for other platforms.wrap

== Commercial games ==
There are 166 games on this list.

Title	Released	Developer(s)	Publisher(s)	Model
3D-OXO	1979		Programma International	
A.F. Asteroids	1979/80	Andrew Farmer	Algray Software	Patched for all models
Acrobat II	1982		Commodore Japan Limited	
AFO			CUE	
Air Attack	1979	Supersoft	Supersoft	
Andromeda Conquest	1982	Microcomputer Games	Avalon Hill	
Atlantic Patrol	1979		Programma International	
B-1 Nuclear Bomber	1980	Microcomputer Games	Avalon Hill	
Baseball Strategy	1981		Avalon Hill	
Basketball	1979		Programma International	
Battlefield!!!	1982		DynaComp	
Battleship	1979		Programma International	
Battleship	1978	M. Richter	Commodore Educational Software	
Blackjack	1978		Commodore Business Machines	
Blackjack	1979		ARESCO	
Blackjack Coach	1983		DynaComp	
Blockade	1979		Programma International	
Bomber Attack	1982	Microcomputer Games	Avalon Hill	
Bridge	1978		PETSoft	
Bridge 2.0	1979		DynaComp	
Bridge Master	1982		DynaComp	
Briefing Charts	1979		Programma International	
Bug + Sic-Rock-Paper	1979		Programma International	
Bulls and Bears	1978	Speakeasy Software	Speakeasy Software	
Casino Blackjack	1979		CMS Software Systems	
Catacombs	1981	Supersoft	Supersoft	
Chirp Invaders	1982		DynaComp	
Cipher Pack	1979		Programma International	
Civil War	1979		Programma International	
Computer Acquire	1980	4D Interactive Systems, Microcomputer Games	Avalon Hill	
Computer Race	1981	Mike Singleton	Petsoft	
Computer Stocks & Bonds	1982	Microcomputer Games	Avalon Hill	
Conflict 2500	1981	Microcomputer Games	Avalon Hill	
Craps + Tic-tac-Toe	1979		Programma International	
Curse of Ra	1979		Automated Simulations	
Deadline	1982		Infocom	
Deflection	1979		ARESCO	
Deflex	1981		Llamasoft	
Depth Charge	1979		Programma International	
Derelict	1982		Aardvark-80	
Disasteroids	1981		Audiogenic	
Dnieper River Line	1982	Microcomputer Games	Avalon Hill	
Dominoes	1979		Programma International	
Dragon's Eye	1981	Southern Software	Automated Simulations	
Draw Poker	1982	Microcomputer Games	Avalon Hill	
Draw Poker 1	1978		Commodore Business Machines	
Driving Ace	1979		Hanimex	
Drone	1979		Programma International	
Dungeon of Death	1979		Instant Software	
Dunjonquest: Morloc's Tower	1979	Automated Simulations	Petsoft	
Echo	1979		Programma International	
Flight Simulator	1983		Commodore Educational Software	
Football	1979		Programma International	
Galaxy	1981	Microcomputer Games	Avalon Hill	
Galaxy Game	1978		Commodore Business Machines	
Goblin Towers	1981	Supersoft	Supersoft	
Grand Prix	1979		Programma International	
Gremlin	1979		Programma International	
Grungy Towers	1981		The Guild Adventure Software	
Guns of Fort Defiance	1981	4D Interactive Systems, Microcomputer Games	Avalon Hill	
Hangman (3)	1980		CUE	
Hangman (4)	1978		CUE	
Hearts 1.5	1980		DynaComp	
Dunjonquest: Hellfire Warrior	1980	Automated Simulations	Petsoft	
Hitchhiker's Guide to the Galaxy, The	1984		Infocom	
Horse Race	1979		Programma International	
Hunt the Wumpus (Hanimex)	1979		Hanimex	
Hunt/Huntwriter	1979		Programma International	
Hurkle (Hanimex)	1979		Hanimex	
Infidel	1983		Infocom	
Invasion Orion	1979	Epyx	Epyx	
Journey to the Center of the Earth	1978		Mad Hatter Software	
Kingdom	1977		Commodore Business Machines	
ladder Mult.	1982		Commodore Educational Software	
Lander	1977	Commodore Business Machines	Commodore Business Machines	
Leather Goddesses of Phobos	1986		Infocom	
Life	1979		Programma International	
Lode Runner	1983	James Bratsanos	Broderbund	
Lords of Karma	1980	Microcomputer Games	Avalon Hill	
Mars	1982		Aardvark-80	
Mastermind	1979		Programma International	
Mazemaster	1979		Programma International	
Mensa Master	1982		DynaComp	
Microchess	1978	Micro-Ware	Personal Software	
Midway Campaign	1980	Microcomputer Games	Avalon Hill	
Millipede	1982	On Line Software	On Line Software	
Mole Attack			HAL Laboratory	
Mystery Fun House	1979	Adventure International	Adventure International	
Name & Adress Files	1979		Programma International	
North Atlantic Convoy Raider	1980	Microcomputer Games	Avalon Hill	
NukeWar	1980	Microcomputer Games	Avalon Hill	
Osero + Reverse	1978		Commodore Business Machines	
Othello (Hanimex)	1979		Hanimex	
Othello (Programma)	1979		Programma International	
PET Checkers	1980	CMS Software Systems	CMS Software Systems	
PET Nuclear Power Plant	1982		Commodore Educational Software	
Picture Kingdom	1981		The Guild Adventure Software	
Pinball	1979		Programma International	
Pinball Wizards	1979		PETSoft	
Pirate Adventure	1979		Adventure International	
Pizza	1981		CUE, Inc.	
Planet Miners	1981	Microcomputer Games	Avalon Hill	
Poker	1979		Instant Software Inc.	
Poker Party	1980		DynaComp	
Pong	1979		Programma International	
Pyramid of Doom	1979	Adventure International	Adventure International	
Quickdraw/Touchdraw	1979		Programma International	
Rabbit Hunt	1979		Programma International	
Rally-X	1981		HAL Laboratory	
Rescue at Rigel	1980	Epyx	Epyx	
Reverse	1981		CUE	
Roadracer Bowler	1982	Microcomputer Games	Avalon Hill	
Rotate	1978		Commodore Business Machines	
Roulette	1979		Programma International	
Santa Paravia en Fiumaccio	1978		Keypunch Software	
Scramble	1979		Programma International	
Shooting Gallery	1979		Programma International	
Shootout at the OK Galaxy	1982	Microcomputer Games	Avalon Hill	
Slot Machine	1979		Programma International	
Solitaire	1979		Instant Software Inc.	
Space Ace	1981	Mike Singleton	Petsoft	
Space Shuttle	1979		Programma International	
Space Trek 2	1979		Hanimex	
Space Wars	1979		Programma International	
SpaceFight	1978		Commodore Business Machines	
Squiggle + Big Time + Monitor	1978		Commodore Business Machines	
Star Force	1979		Astar International	
Star Trader Orion	1980		Automated Simulations	
Starcross	1982		Infocom	
Starfire (LLamasoft)	1980		LLamasoft	
Starfleet Orion	1978	Epyx	Epyx	
StarQuest: Rescue at Rigel	1980	Automated Simulations	Automated Simulations	
Startrak	1979		Programma International	
Steeple Chase	1979		Programma International	
Strange Odyssey	1979	Adventure International	Adventure International	
Super Galaxians			HAL Laboratory	
Super Nim	1979		Programma International	
Supertrap	1978		Instant Software Inc.	
Tank Arkade	1982	Microcomputer Games	Avalon Hill	
Tanktics	1978	Microcomputer Games	Avalon Hill	
Target	1979		Programma International	
Target Pong + Off-The-Wall	1978		Commodore Business Machines	
Telengard	1982	Microcomputer Games	Avalon Hill	
Dunjonquest: Temple of Apshai	1979	Automated Simulations	Petsoft	
The Count	1979	Adventure International	Adventure International	
The Datestones of Ryn	1979	Epyx	Epyx	
Thousand Miles	1979		Programma International	
Three of a Kind	1979		Programma International	
Tic Tac Toe (Hanimex)	1979		Hanimex	
Time Trek	1979		Programma International	
Trail West	1980		Micro-Ed Inc.	
Trek Adventure	1982		Aardvark-80	
Upper Reaches of Apshai	1979		Automated Simulations	
Valdez	1980		Dynacomp	
Valley of the Minotaur	1983	Nicolas van Dyk, Chris M. Evans	Zeuss Scientific	
Vaults of Zurich, The	1981		Artworx Software Company	
Video Checkers	1979		Programma International	
Voyager I: Sabotage of the Robot Ship	1982	Microcomputer Games	Avalon Hill	
Who Dunit	1979		Programma International	
Will 'o the Wisp	1980		Discovery Games	
Wrap Trap	1979		Hanimex	
Wurfball (German)	1978		Commodore Business Machines	
ZAP	1979		Programma International	
Zork I: The Great Underground Empire	1981		Infocom	
Zork II: The Wizard of Frobozz	1981		Infocom	
Zork III: The Dungeon Master	1982		Infocom	

== Aftermarket titles ==
There are 34 games on this list.

Title	Released	Developer(s)	Publisher(s)	Model
3D Monster Maze	2021	David Curran	Tynemouth Software	
Asteroidz	2026	Milasoft		
Attack of the PETSCII Robots	2021	David Murray	The 8-Bit Guy	
Berserk	2025	Milasoft		
Candy Conquer	2021	Milasoft	Milasoft	
Castle Smash (Warlords clone)	2026	Milasoft		Mono/colour PET's/32k
Defender	2020	Jim Orlando		
Down!	2013	Revival Studios	Revival Studios	
Escape from Petscii Castle	2024	Jim Orlando		
Girl Test				
Gridrunner	2022	Milasoft		
Hey Taxi	2023	Milasoft	Milasoft	3032/4032
Hive Dive (Galaga)	2026	Milasoft		16K/32K
Island Rescue	2023	Milasoft		3032/4032
Ladybug	2013	Mr. NOP		
Mage: The Enchanted Crystals	2018	Revival Studios	Revival Studios	
Oils Well	2013	Mr. NOP		
Pengy (Pengo)	2026	Youki Games		
PET Tetris	2010	Tim Howe		40 column, 3000 ROMs Mini (8k) 16k(normal) 32k (with DAC sounds)
PETaxian	2023	Milasoft & Borgar Olsen		3032/4032
PETLifter	2022	Jim Orlando		
PETFall	2026	Milasoft		
PETvaders	2026	Chris Garrett		
Qixie	2025	Milasoft		
Radar Rat Race	2025	Milasoft		
Rotor Rampage	2024	David Duke & Ken McIlveen		
Slimed	2024	Milasoft		2001
Space Chase	2016	Christian Krenner		
Space Invaders (color PET)	2024	Professor Satoshi Matsuoka	MilaSoft	30xx/40xx
Space Invaders 2	2022	Jim Orlando		
Spyders	2017	Mr. NOP		8032
Trainyard	2023	Jim Orlando		
World Soccer League	2020	Nick Sherman	Arlagames	
Yars Galaxy	2026	Milasoft		

== Type-in / Public-domain titles ==
There are 242 games on this list.

Title	Released	Developer(s)	Publisher(s)	Model
51 (German)	1983			
17 und 4 (German)	1978			
23 Matches	1979	Creative Computing Software	Creative Computing Software	
3-D Tic-Tac-Toe	1978		Creative Computing Software	
3D Star Trek				
A Scrambled Word Game	1980			
Acey Deucy	1980	Vince Mills		
Adventure 1: Cavern of Riches	1980	John O'Hare	John O'Hare	
Adventure 2: The Great Pyramid	1980	John O'Hare		
Adventure 3: Haunted Mansion	1980	John O'Hare		
Adventure Castle	1983	Andreas Pidde		3032, 17k
Adventureland	1980			
AFO (Japanese)				
Agicol				
Aircraft Landing		K. Bywater & B. Rai		
Alien Attack		Peter Wright		
Aliens!	1980	Mike Hamilton	The Code Works	2001
Alligator Swamp (German)		Jos Leppens		
Ambush!	1980	Phil Bayman	The Code Works	
Android Nim	1979	Don Dennis		
Arrow	1980	Jim Butterfield		
Artillery	1979	Jeff Jessee	Creative Computing Software	
Astro-Rescue	1982	Jim Summers		3032/4032
Atlantic Patrol	1978	R.D. Watts		
Auto Rally	1979	Wolfgang Fiebig		
Awari	1979	Creative Computing Software	Creative Computing Software	
Bagels	1979	Creative Computing Software	Creative Computing Software	
Baseball	1977			
Bat!	1979	C.T. Nadovich	The Code Works	
Bets	1980	Randall Lockwood	The Code Works	
Bjack	1979		The Code Works	
Blasto!	1981	Robert Notebloom	The Code Works	
Blockade Special!	1981			
Bomber	1980			
Bonzo!	1980	Randall Lockwood	The Code Works	
Bop	1978	Glen Fisher	The Code Works	
Boswain	1980	C.T. Nadovich	The Code Works	
Box	1979		The Code Works	
Break	1982	Georg Feil		
Breakthru				All models
Breakout	1980			
Brick	1978	Glen Fisher	The Code Works	
Bridge Bidding Trainer	1979	James C. Downer		
Bship	1978	Howard Arrington	The Code Works	
Bugg	1981	Kevin Pickell		30xx/40xx
Buggy	1980			
Butterfield Social & Recreational Club	1980			
Canyon	1979	Larry Stevens	The Code Works	
Canyon	1981	Kevin Pickell		
Capture!	1980	Malcom Michael	The Code Works	
Car Race II	1980	Satoru Iwata		
Cascade	1982	A. Millett	CCI Nov 1982	
Castle Adventure		David Malmberg		
Catch!	1980	George Leotti	The Code Works	
Caves of Ice	1983	Robert Tsuk		
Checkers!	1980	Tom Skibo	The Code Works	
Chess Game	1980			
Chomp	1979	Creative Computing Software	Creative Computing Software	
Civil War	1978		Creative Computing Software	
Clone	1982	Nick Jackiw	The Code Works	
Computer Spacegames	1982		Usborne Publishing	
Contact	1982	George Leotti	The Code Works	
Cops	1979	Glen Fisher	The Code Works	
Cosmic Cosmiads	1981	Derek J. Hipkin		
Cosmic Fighter	1982	MS Software		
Cosmic Jailbreak	1982			
Course	1979	Glen Fisher	The Code Works	
Crazy Balloon	1980			
Crossword Puzzle	1980			
Deepspace	1979		Creative Computing Software	
Defend!	1981	Randall Lockwood	The Code Works	
Demon!	1979	Ken Morley	The Code Works	
Diamond Hunt II	1990	Joe Commodore		
Dive	1982	Pat Persch	The Code Works	
Dog Star Adventure	1980			
Dominos	1980			
Donuts	1980			
Dot Racer	1980			
Dots	1978	Glen Fisher	The Code Works	
Drag	1980	Earl Furman	The Code Works	
Dragon Island	1978			
Duel	1980			
Dungeon	1979	Brian Sawyer	The Code Works	
ELIZA	1979		Creative Computing Software	
Emaze	1981	Teece Jurgensen	The Code Works	
Enigma	1980		The Code Works	
Epidemic	1980			
Est	1978	Glen Fisher	The Code Works	
Everest	1979	Brian Sawyer	The Code Works	
Fball	1979		The Code Works	
Face	1978	Glen Fisher	The Code Works	
Fball	1979		The Code Works	
Ferry	1979	John Matarella	The Code Works	
Fifteen	1979		The Code Works	
Fire!	1980	Brian Sawyer	The Code Works	All models
Flash Attack	1980	Mach 1 Software	Mach 1 Software	
Flip-Flop	1979	Creative Computing Software	Creative Computing Software	
Forest	1980			
Frog Race	1980			
Frog!	1980	Bob Carr	The Code Works	
G-Word	1981	Jim Wildermuth	The Code Works	
Gammon	1979		The Code Works	
Ganzen Schieten	1980			
Godzilla!	1980		The Code Works	
Golf	1978		Creative Computing Software	
Gomoku	1979	David Malmberg	The Code Works	
Gremlin	1980			
Gribbet	1980			
Guess	1979	Creative Computing Software	The Code Works	
Guess It	1980			
Gunner	1980			
Hamurabi	1978		Creative Computing Software	
Hang Man	1980			
Hanoi	1978		The Code Works	
Hartenjagen	1980			
Heart Racer	1980			
Hexapawn	1979	Creative Computing Software	Creative Computing Software	
Hi-Q	1979	Creative Computing Software	Creative Computing Software	
Hman	1978	Glen Fisher	Creative Computing Software	
Horserace!	1979		Creative Computing Software	
Hurkle	1978		Creative Computing Software	
Ian's Speed Race	1979			
Joust	1980	Brian Sawyer	Creative Computing Software	
Kalah	1980		The Code Works	
Keno	1979	Creative Computing Software	Creative Computing Software	
King Tut's Tomb Adventure	1979			
Krypto	1982	Gray Marsa	The Code Works	
Labyrinth	1980			
Land-Slide	1981	Kevin Pickell		
Lander X	1980			
Laser Tanks	1980			
Lawn!	1981	Kathy Higby	The Code Works	
Leap	1979	Glen Fisher	The Code Works	
Leap Frog				
Legionnaire	1979			
LEM	1979	Creative Computing Software	Creative Computing Software	
Life	1980	Cortex Computer Systems		
Life II	1978		Creative Computing Software	
M-Maze	1980			
Mad	1978		The Code Works	
The Mad Bomber	1980			
Master Mind	1980			
Match	1979	George Macrae	The Code Works	
Matches	1978			
Maxit	1981	Harry Saal	The Code Works	
Maze	1979	Howard Arrington	The Code Works	
Meteor	1983			
Mind	1979	Glen Fisher	The Code Works	
Miner!	1980	Ron Longfellow	The Code Works	
The Miser's House	1981	M.J. Lansing	The Code Works	
Mission 2001	1981			
Mount St. Helens	1980			
Mousemaze	1980			
Nab!	1980	Malcolm Michael	The Code Works	
Nazo no Enban AFO	1980			
Night Drive	1982			
Nim	1979			
Orac Draughts	1981	A. Millett		
Othello	1978			
Ouranos!	1980		The Code Works	
Outpost	1980			
Paladin (Defender)	1982	Kevin Pickell		
Pegboard	1979		The Code Works	
Penetrator	1983	Brian French	Micronoid	
PetChess Universe	1981		Philidor Software	
PET Panic	1981	Jim Orlando		
Pick-Up	1979		The Code Works	
Piegram	1979		The Code Works	
Pinball	1980			
Ping Pong	1980			
Planet Probe	1980			
Poker	1980		The Code Works	
Police!	1980		The Code Works	
Pong	1980			
The Postperson's Route	1980			
Ppong	1980			
Qubic	1980			
Quix	1978	Glen Fisher	The Code Works	
Race	1978	ken Kasmar	The Code Works	
Racer!	1981		The Code Works	
Ratrun	1979		The Code Works	
Rescue!	1981		The Code Works	
Revers!	1979		The Code Works	
Reverse	1980			
Rotate	1978			
Royal Flush	1981			
Ruler	1980		The Code Works	
S-Racer	1980			
Safe!	1981		The Code Works	
Scramble	1982	Heiner Eichmann		
Sea Battle	1979		Creative Computing Software	
Search	1979		The Code Works	
Shark	1978	Glen Fisher	The Code Works	
Sheep	1980		The Code Works	
Shoot	1978	Gary Bainbridge	The Code Works	
Ski		Mike Singleton		
Siege	1983	Mike Singleton		
Simulation of Millikan Oil Drop Experiment	1980			
Sinners	1978		Computers/Calculators Magazine	
Slime	1982	Jim Summers		
Slot	1979	Mark Heaney	The Code Works	
Slot Machine	1980			
Sorcerer's Castle Adventure	1979	Mad Hatter Software		
Space Debris	1981	Kevin Moughtin		
Space Invaders	1980	Professor Satoshi Matsuoka		
Space Race	2020	Andrew Jary		
Space Shooter	1980			
Space!	1979	Greg Erker	The Code Works	
Spacewar	1979		Creative Computing Software	
Spot	1980		The Code Works	
Starfighter	1980			
Star Spores	1982	Jim Summers		
Star Trek	1978	Ronald V. Abruzzo		
Star Trek 64	1983			
States	1979		The Code Works	
Sumer	1981		Crystal Computer	
Super Trek	1979		Creative Computing Software	
Tank!	1981		The Code Works	
Thunt!	1980		The Code Works	
Tic Tac Toe	1978			
Time Traveler	1980	Krell Software		
Titrator	1979		The Code Works	
Toker	1979			
Torpedeo	1980			
TRON: Journey to the MCP	1982			
TRON: Light Cycle Game	1982			
Tunnel Vision and Kat and Mouse	1978			
Twonky	1979		The Code Works	
Vector Chase	1983			
Volcano	1980			
Voyage to Atlantis	1980			
Wander	1978		The Code Works	
War	1981	Kevin Moughtin		
Watchperson	1980	Mac Oglesby	PET Games and Recreations	
Winged Samurai	1980			
Wipeout	1979		The Code Works	
The Wizard's Castle	1980			
Wumpus II	1979	Gregory Yob	Creative Computing Software	
Yahtzee	1979	The Code Works		
Zap	1978	Tom Marazita	The Code Works	
Zeeslag				
Zone X	1978	Creative Computing Software	Creative Computing Software	
