= Twonky =

Twonky may refer to:

- The Twonky, a 1953 science-fiction comedy film based on a short story by Lewis Padgett
- TwonkyMedia server, a multi-media content home server
- "The Twonky", a 1943 short story by C. L. Moore and Henry Kuttner, awarded a Retro-Hugo Award in 2018
- Twonky (video game), a Commodore PET game

== See also ==
- Twinkie (disambiguation)
