= Dog Star Adventure =

Text adventure game by Lance Micklus

- Cover of SoftSide May 1979
- Developer: Lance Micklus
- Publisher: SoftSide
- Platforms: TRS-80 (original); Commodore PET
- Release: 1979
- Genre: Interactive fiction

Dog Star Adventure is a text adventure game written by Lance Micklus in TRS-80 BASIC and published as the cover article in the May 1979 issue of SoftSide magazine. It is historically notable as the first example of the source code to a text adventure being published, and as a result, many later text adventures are based on its concepts.

The game takes place in the Star Wars universe, loosely following the plot of the movie during the action that takes place on the Death Star. Names of the various characters are changed to avoid copyright issues. The player has to gather a number of items to repair their ship, rescue princess Leya, and escape without being detected by the many Roche Soldiers.

== Release ==
The game was simultaneously released on cassette tape by SoftSide publishing spin-off, The Software Exchange. A port to the Commodore PET was made by David Malmberg in 1980, with most of the names returned to their Star Wars versions. The original source was republished in The Captain 80 Book of BASIC Adventures in 1981, and again in the June 1982 issue of Computer and Video Games. It was also sold by Adventure International under the name Death Planet: The Dog Star Adventure.

== Gameplay ==
Dog Star is based on a two-word parser, with the user entering verb/noun phrases like TAKE CHEESEBURGER. A small number of commands can be shortened to a single word, like NORTH, or even shorter, N. The game is played by the player issuing commands to move about the game map and collect various items.

The game begins with the player in control of a robot hiding in their spaceship. The ship is disabled and trapped within a hangar. The player needs to collect several items in order to win, including money, the enemy battle plans, and Princess Leia, the leader of the Freedom Fighters. These are scattered around the game map, some of them protected by various puzzles or traps.

The game had a number of additions to the basic two-word model. Among these was a cheeseburger which had to be fed to a security robot. The cheeseburger cooled off over time, forcing the user to complete this task before that occurred, a concept Micklus refers to as a "time bomb". The game also included a storage depot filled with "all kinds of things", including many of the items needed to complete the game. The player had to find out what items to TAKE by carefully reading hints spread through the game. Finally, the game also included a feature from the classic Hunt the Wumpus: in certain locations the game would tell the user about nearby sounds, which the player had to use to avoid dangerous encounters.

== Development ==
The PET conversion changed most of the terminology back to Star Wars, and added this character graphics splash screen.

Micklus had written several commercial programs before Dog Star, mostly for the TRS-80. Micklus credits the original Colossal Cave Adventure for inspiring him to write Dog Star. Adventure was written in FORTRAN on the PDP-10, a system with considerably more memory than early microcomputers. The work creating Dog Star was primarily an effort porting these basic concepts to BASIC while keeping within the small amount of available memory. The game itself is very small and simple as a result.

Dog Star was written in the very limited TRS-80 Level I BASIC, so many of the techniques used in the game were easily adapted to other dialects of BASIC. The key concept is the way the game uses an array to describe the room layouts, with different numbers representing various objects or connections to other rooms. Since Model I BASIC had only a single array, storing all of the required data required some clever coding. In other BASICs with multiple arrays, this was much easier.

The basic idea is that the map is drawn out on paper and each location on it, or "room", is assigned a number. That number is used to retrieve information about the room or the items within it. One or more arrays then hold the game state. For instance, a room in Dog Star allowed six possible exits, up, down and the four cardinal directions. Any given room might have one or more of these exits connecting to other rooms around it. This means there are 2^{6} = 64 possible variations, which can be represented as a number between 0 (no exits) and 63 (all exits are available) using bit manipulation.

So for a given room, say room 10, the game can store the exits in slot 10 in the EXIT array, the name of the room, "docking bay", in slot 10 in the NAME array, a longer description, "in the docking bay, the ship sits in the center", in slot 10 of the DESC array, and any items in that location in slot 10 of the ITEM array. If the user picks up an item it is removed from slot 10 of ITEM, and can be added to any other slot if the user drops that item in another location.

These concepts were widely copied in the early microcomputer field, and can be found almost verbatim in many other adventures of the era, including Survival.
