= CURSOR =

Computer-based magazine (1978–1982)

- № 9 (April 1979)
- Publisher: The Code Works
- First issue: July 1978
- Final issue: May 1982
- Country: United States of America

CURSOR: Programs for PET Computers was an early computer-based "magazine" that was distributed on cassette from 1978 and into the early 1980s. Each issue, consisting of the cassette itself and a short newsletter including a table of contents, contained programs, utilities, and games. Produced for users of the Commodore PET, and available by subscription only, CURSOR was a forerunner of the later disk magazines ("diskmags") that came about as floppy disk drives became common, and eventually ubiquitous, in home and personal computing during the 1980s.

Ron Jeffries and Glen Fisher, of the software company The Code Works of Goleta, California, was CURSOR's publisher and editor, respectively.

Each issue came with five or six programs, preceded by a "cover page" program (which was initially a simple animation, but in later issues became more sophisticated, allowing the user to select a program to be loaded from the tape). Among programs circulated by CURSOR included rudimentary animations, such as "Dromeda", which was an adaptation of the film The Andromeda Strain; games, such as a version of the Star Trek text-based campaign game, "Twonky" (a version of Hunt the Wumpus), and "Ratrun", an early dungeon crawl-style game (only with the player as a mouse searching for a piece of cheese in a 3D maze); and simple utility programs such as spreadsheets and code-tweakers (including a utility that allowed the PET to display lower-case lettering). Initially, programs (specifically games and animations) distributed on Cursor did not have sound, as the PET did not initially have this capability. As external audio devices such as Soundware became available for PET models, sound-capable programs began to appear in Cursor; these programs were identified by an exclamation point (!) in the title. For example: "Aliens!" or "Dromeda!".

CURSOR was discontinued in the early 1980s when the PET was superseded by other platforms. In total, 30 issues of the magazine were published. Issue #30 had the date May, 1982.

In 1981, McGraw-Hill published the book PET Fun and Games: Selected CURSOR Programs by Jeffries and Fisher (ISBN 0-931988-70-5), which included the Commodore Basic source code for 31 of the game programs previously released on CURSOR cassettes. The PET was supplanted by the Commodore 64, which provided color, sound, sprites and color graphics. Jeffries, Fischer and Brian Sawyer wrote Commodore 64 Fun and Games ISBN 0-88134-116-9), containing the listings of 35 games in BASIC that utilized the features of the new Commodore.
