= Mugwump (disambiguation) =

Mugwumps were a group of Republican activists who supported Democratic candidate Grover Cleveland in the United States presidential election of 1884.

Mugwump or Mugwumps may also refer to:

- Mugwump (video game), an early computer game written in BASIC
- The Mugwumps (band), a 1960s rock band
- Mugwump (folklore), a lake monster purported to live in Lake Timiskaming, Canada
- "Mugwump", a 1996 song by Terrorvision from Regular Urban Survivors
- Mugwumps, creatures from the William S. Burroughs novel Naked Lunch and its film adaptation
- Supreme Mugwump, the title for the head of the International Confederation of Wizards in J.K. Rowling's Harry Potter series
