= Commodore 8280 =

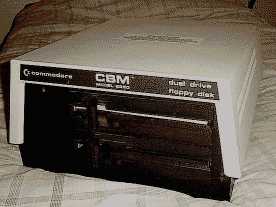
- Manufacturer: Commodore Business Machines, Inc.
- Type: Floppy drive
- Media: 2 × 8" double-sided, double-density floppy disk
- Operating system: CBM DOS 3.0
- CPU: 2 × MOS 6502 @ 1 MHz
- Storage: 1024 kB per disk
- Connectivity: Parallel IEEE-488
- Dimensions: 380mm / 200mm / 420mm
- Backward compatibility: PET, 4000-series, 8000-series, B128; Commodore 64, Commodore 128, VIC-20 with IEEE-488 adapter
- Predecessor: Commodore 8061/62
- Successor: Commodore 8050
- Related: Commodore D9060, D9090

The Commodore 8280 is a dual 8" floppy disk drive for Commodore International computers. It uses a wide rectangular steel case form similar to that of the Commodore 4040, and uses the parallel IEEE-488 interface common to Commodore PET/CBM computers.

The 8280 replaced the earlier 806x series 8" drives and switched to half-height drives. Like the 8061/62 units, the 8280 supports IBM 3740 disks. However, instead of 500k group code recording (GCR) format used by other Commodore drives, it uses MFM as its native disk recording format, the only 8-bit Commodore drive to do so apart from the 1581. Contrary to the 8061/62, the drive ROM has the capability for formatting disks and verifying them, eliminating the need for external utility disk for these operations. The manual contains also a simple BASIC listing of a program to read sectors from IBM 3470 disks.
