= Educator 64 =

Computer

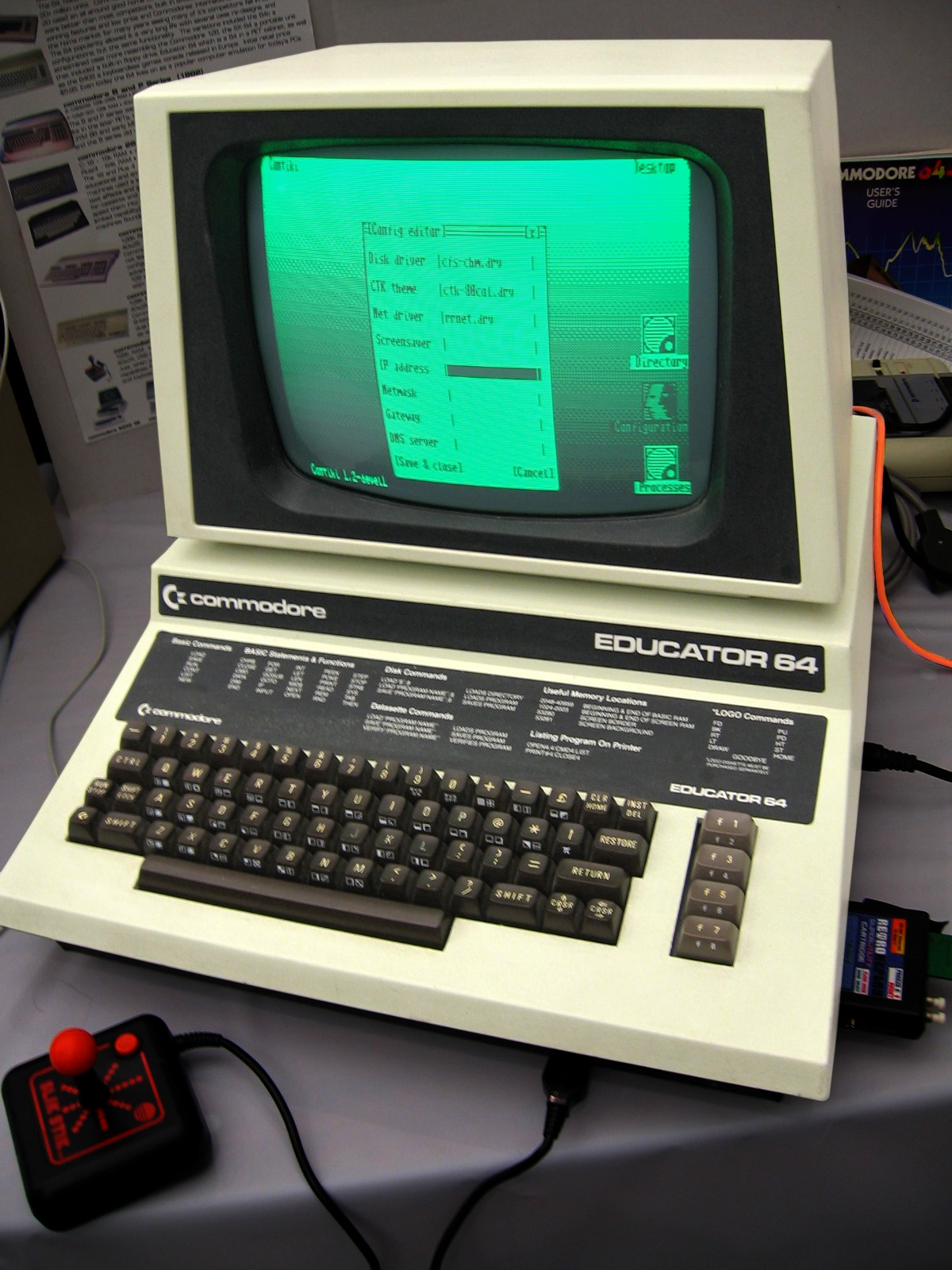
- Educator 64 running the Contiki operating system
- Also known as: Model 4064, PET 64
- Manufacturer: Commodore Business Machines (CBM)
- Type: Personal computer
- Released: October 1984; 41 years ago
- Operating system: Commodore BASIC 2.0
- CPU: MOS Technology 6510 @ 1 MHz
- Memory: 64 KB (upgradeable)
- Graphics: VIC-II (320×200, 16 colors, sprites, raster interrupt)
- Sound: SID 6581/8580 (3× osc, 4× wave, filter, ADSR, ring)
- Controller input: Joystick and Mouse
- Connectivity: Serial port, Datasette port, parallel programmable "User" port, C64 expansion port

The Educator 64, also known as the PET 64 and Model 4064, is a microcomputer made by Commodore Business Machines in October 1984. It was sold exclusively to schools as a replacement for aging Commodore PET systems. Schools were reluctant to adopt the Commodore 64 "breadbox" design due to theft or vandalism of the smaller, more exposed components. The 4064 designation followed in line with the PET's 4008, 4016, and 4032 models as a 64 KB 40-column model.

The internals of the Educator 64 were refurbished Commodore 64 motherboards and monochromatic green monitors, while the external cases were repurposed from the PET line. The area above the keyboard contained a quick reference card for BASIC 2.0 and Commodore DOS commands. The only differences between the Educator 64 and the other 64 models were the graphics capabilities, the built-in speaker, the sound amplifier with volume control, the 3.5 mm mini-jack for mono sound output to headphones, the internal power supply, and the keyboard which is missing the color abbreviations imprinted on the front edge of the number keys. The Educator 64 retained the ability to display shades of green, while the PET 64 and 4064 were monochrome-only. Though the PET 4008/4016/4032 computers have cases made entirely of metal, only the Educator 64's base is metal; the upper case is made of thick plastic. Select models of the Educator 64 came built-in with the Covox Voice Master, a speech-synthesis board originally for the Commodore 64.

Despite selling for only between US$350 to $375 (equivalent to $1,085 to $1,162 in 2025), the Educator 64 was not sold in great numbers. It suffered from its monochrome display – most Commodore 64 software assumed the availability of color. And, by that time, the US education market was firmly in the Apple II's color graphics supporting grasp.

The Educator 64 marked the final product of the aging PET line, which had been introduced in 1977.
