= Commodore 8060 =

- Manufacturer: Commodore Business Machines, Inc.
- Type: Floppy drive
- Media: 8" double-sided, double-density floppy disk (8060); 2 × 8" double-sided, double-density floppy disk (8061/8062)
- Operating system: CBM DOS 2.7
- CPU: 2 × MOS 6502 @ 1 MHz
- Storage: 750 kB per disk (8060) 800 kB per disk (8061) 1.6 mB per disk (8062)
- Connectivity: Parallel IEEE-488
- Backward compatibility: PET, 4000-series, 8000-series, B128; Commodore 64, Commodore 128, VIC-20 with IEEE-488 adapter
- Successor: Commodore 8280, 8050

The Commodore 8060, 8061, and 8062 are a series of 8" floppy disk drives developed by Commodore Business Machines. These disk drives use the parallel interface IEEE-488 to connect with Commodore's PET and CBM-II line of microcomputers. The 8060 is a single-disk model, while the 8061 and 8062 are both double-drive models similar to the later Commodore 8280 8" drive. The drives in the 806x series are full-height Shugart SA-800s.

All of the models in the 8060 series use Commodore group coded recording (GCR) for disk reading and writing; the later 8061 and 8062 models can also read and write IBM 3740 format disks. Each drive in the series contains two MOS 6502 microprocessors for operating the disk controllers and executing the built-in disk operating system. The built-in operating system is CBM DOS 2.7. The ROM on the 8061 and 8062 does not contain support for formatting disks; instead a provided utility disk had the formatter program, which allows the user to select between native 806x and IBM 3740 formats. The utility disk also contained a program for doing whole disk copies of IBM disks as well as the VALIDATE command, which is included in the ROM of all other Commodore drives.
