= Twink (disambiguation) =

Twink is a term for a young or young-looking gay or bisexual man. It may also refer to:

- Twink (internet slang), a role-playing game player who engages in twinking
- Twink (musician) or John Charles Edward Alder (born 1944), British singer and drummer
- Adele King or Twink (born 1951), Irish entertainer
- Hollywood Stars or the Twinks, an American minor league baseball team
- Twink, a character from Rainbow Brite
- Twink, a character in Paper Mario
- Twink, a brand of correction fluid and a generic term for correction fluid in New Zealand

== People with the given name ==
- Twink Caplan (born 1947), American actress, comedian, and producer
- Twink Twining (1894–1973), Major League Baseball pitcher

== See also ==
- Twinkie (disambiguation)
