= Killer poke =

Software means of causing computer hardware damage

In computer jargon, a killer poke is a method of inducing physical hardware damage on a machine or its peripherals by the insertion of invalid values, via, for example, BASIC's POKE command, into a memory-mapped control register. The term is typically used to describe a family of fairly well known tricks that can overload the analog electronics in the CRT monitors of computers lacking hardware sanity checking (notable examples being the IBM Portable and Commodore PET.)

== Specific examples ==
=== Zuse Z1/Z3 ===
The Z1 (1938) and Z3 (1941) computers built by Konrad Zuse contained illegal sequences of instructions which damaged the hardware if executed by accident.

=== Commodore PET ===
The PET-specific killer poke is connected to the architecture of that machine's video rasterizer circuits. In early PETs, writing a certain value to the memory address of a certain I/O register (POKE 59458,62) made the machine able to display text and graphics on the screen 106% faster. This was accomplished by disabling a "wait to print to screen" safeguard designed to reduce static/noise by preventing the shared VRAM from being read by the display at the same time as it was being written to by the CPU. With this safeguard disabled, graphics could appear on the screen twice as fast, but small bits of static would also appear. Despite the static, some games designed for early PETs included this POKE in their source code in order to benefit from the faster graphics.

When the PET range was revamped with updated hardware, the video rasterizer circuits were redesigned to run at a faster speed and without the need for a "wait to print" safeguard. Thus, the old POKE trick no longer resulted in faster graphics. Instead, performing the old trick on the new hardware led to strange behavior by the new video chip, which could cause signal contention and possibly damage the PET's integrated CRT monitor. This is because the exact pin targeted by the POKE command used to control display timing, but in the upgraded video chip, that pin controlled the vertical sync. Thus, running the POKE on the newer hardware caused graphics to compress vertically, sometimes down to an extremely bright horizontal line. Fears that this anomaly might burn in to the display led to the nickname "killer poke"; however, it is not known to have ever caused any permanent damage to the monitor.

=== Commodore 1541 Disk Drive ===
The Commodore 64 had an optional external 5-1/4" floppy drive. The Commodore 1541 contained a 6502 microprocessor which was used to run Commodore DOS and also to manage the drive mechanism. The drives stored data on 35 tracks (#0–34), and the stepper motor could be manually controlled through BASIC by PRINT#-ing "MEMORY-WRITE" commands to the drive (which correspond to the POKE command of BASIC, but write to the drive's internal memory and I/O registers, not those of the computer itself). If the drive was at either end of its range (track 0 or track 39) and it was commanded to continue moving, there was no software or firmware method to prevent drive damage. Continued "knocking" of the drive head against the stop would throw the mechanism out of alignment. The problem was exacerbated by copy protection techniques that used non-standard disk formats with unusual track counts. The Commodore 1571 had an optical head stop instead of a mechanical one.

=== LG CD-ROM drives ===
Certain models of LG CD-ROM drives with specific firmware used an abnormal command for "update firmware": the "clear buffer" command usually used on CD-RW drives. Linux uses this command to tell the difference between CD-ROM and CD-RW drives. Most CD-ROM drives dependably return an error for the unsupported CD-RW command, but the faulty drives interpreted it as "update firmware", causing them to stop working (or, in casual parlance, to be "bricked").

=== Flash memory ===
The resource of flash memory is large, but subject to wear. Since writing to storage is an essential operation, most applications have enough privileges to exhaust the resource of flash chips within weeks by filling the storage enough to cause write amplification and continuously rewriting a small file.

=== MSi Laptops UEFI ===
Systemd mounts variables used by Unified Extensible Firmware Interface on Linux system's sysfs as writable by the root user of a system. As a result, it is possible for the root user of a system to completely brick a system with a non-conforming UEFI implementation (specifically some MSi laptops) by using the rm command to delete the /sys/firmware/efi/efivars/ directory, or recursively delete the root directory.

=== Samsung Galaxy displays ===
A number of Samsung Galaxy devices have been reported to be affected by a firmware update whose display drivers pushed the screen beyond its limits and incurred irreversible damage to the AMOLED displays used on the phones, leaving permanent green or pink lines on the screens after updating to the latest One UI software.

== See also ==
- Stuxnet, malware designed to cause physical wear in industrial centrifuges
- Bricking, the act of misconfiguring a device so as to make it cease functioning
- CIH (computer virus), a virus that can flash the BIOS
- Halt and Catch Fire, a less destructive operation which halts the CPU but can usually be recovered by power-cycling.
