= Gregory Yob =

American video game designer (1945–2005)

Gregory H. Coresun
- Born: Gregory Yob; June 18, 1945; Eugene, Oregon
- Died: October 13, 2005 (aged 60); Scottsdale, Arizona
- Other names: Hara Ra; Gregory H. Coresun
- Known for: Hunt the Wumpus
- Scientific career
- Fields: Computer game designer

Gregory Yob (June 18, 1945 – October 13, 2005) was an American computer game designer.

== Early life ==
Gregory was born in Eugene, Oregon. An article about his experiment on simulating gravitational fields with droplets of water on a soap bubble was published in Scientific American in December 1964, under The Amateur Scientist.

== Career ==
His one published game, Hunt the Wumpus (1975), written while he was attending University of Massachusetts Dartmouth, is one of the earliest adventure games. While living in Palo Alto, California, Yob came across logic games on a mainframe computer named Hurkle, Snark, and Mugwump. Each of these games was based on a 10 × 10 grid, and Yob recognized that a puzzle game on a computer could have a far more complex structure. He created the world for Wumpus in the shape of a dodecahedron, in part because as a child he made a kite with that shape.

In the late 1980s he designed Comfort House. He wrote: "Comfort House is a new form of entertainment. High technology and interactive systems combine with your participation to give you an enjoyable evening uniquely attuned to your senses and mind." It was never built.

He was an engineer and helped build the first iteration of student radio station KDVS at University of California, Davis, where he ran an avant-garde show.

Gregory Yob, also known as Hara Ra, had changed his name to Gregory H. Coresun shortly before his death.

In recent years he had made his home in Santa Cruz, California.

== Death ==
After five days in a diabetic coma at the intensive care unit in Santa Cruz, on October 13, 2005, he was airlifted to a hospice in Scottsdale, Arizona, where he died that evening. Technicians from Alcor Life Extension Foundation were present and started preparations immediately. His body was moved into an ice bath and taken to Alcor's Scottsdale facility where his severed head underwent neuropreservation.
