= The Captain 80 Book of BASIC Adventures =

1981 book by Robert Liddil

- Author: Robert Liddil
- Language: English
- Genre: Non-fiction
- Publication date: 1981

The Captain 80 Book of BASIC Adventures is a book written by Robert Liddil and published in 1981.

== Contents ==
The book contains a short foreword by Scott Adams, and is then divided into three parts.

The first part contains seven short essays on adventure games. The second part contains "The Adventure Generator," by David Huntress, a nine-page BASIC program that resembles a game creation system, except that whereas a typical IF authoring system would read its input from a file on disk, "The Adventure Generator" takes input interactively. The user inputs their room descriptions, objects, verbs, and map directions one at a time in response to prompts from the program, and the program outputs a BASIC program listing which implements their game.

The third and longest part contains type-in listings for 18 adventure games, all presented in BASIC suitable for a 16K Level II TRS-80 computer.

- Atlantean Odyssey, by Teri Li
- Dog Star, by Lance Micklus
- Thunder Road, by Don & Freda Boner
- Deadly Dungeon, by Don & Freda Boner
- Revenge of Balrog, by Don & Freda Boner
- The Fortress at Times-End, by Don & Freda Boner
- Temple of the Sun, by Jack Powers
- Lost Ship, by Charles Forsythe
- Spider Mountain, by Teri Li
- Lost Dutchman's Gold, by Teri Li
- Journey to the Center of the Earth, by Greg Hassett
- King Tut's Tomb, by Greg Hassett
- Voyage to Atlantis, by Greg Hassett
- House of Seven Gables, by Greg Hassett
- Sorcerer's Castle, by Greg Hassett
- CIA Adventure, by Hugh Lampert
- Arctic Adventure, by Harry McCracken
- Adventureland, by Scott Adams

The Boners' Revenge of Balrog and The Fortress at Times-End form a two-part adventure set in the same world of "Graylockland" as Spider Mountain and Deadly Dungeon.

== Reception ==
Dick Mcgrath reviewed the book for Computer Gaming World, and stated that "Although the [...] price tag is a bit steep (considering the economy level quality of the printing and binding), the book is still a great value if you really intend to make use of all the program listings. The bad news, of course, is that it will take you about three months of steady typing to input the listings and another three months to debug your typographical errors."

== Reviews ==
- Computer and Video Games
- Creative Computing
- Your Computer
