= Twinkie (disambiguation) =

A Twinkie is a snack cake with a cream filling.

Twinkie(s) may also refer to:

- Twinkie (slur), a pejorative term
- Twinkie Clark (b. 1954), a musician
- Twinkies, a nickname for the Minnesota Twins
- Twinkie, a character from the Fast & Furious franchise most notably from The Fast and the Furious: Tokyo Drift

== See also ==
- Twinkie defense, a legal strategy
- Twinky, the original British title of Lola (1969 film)
- Twink (disambiguation)
