= Mugwump (video game) =

1973 video game

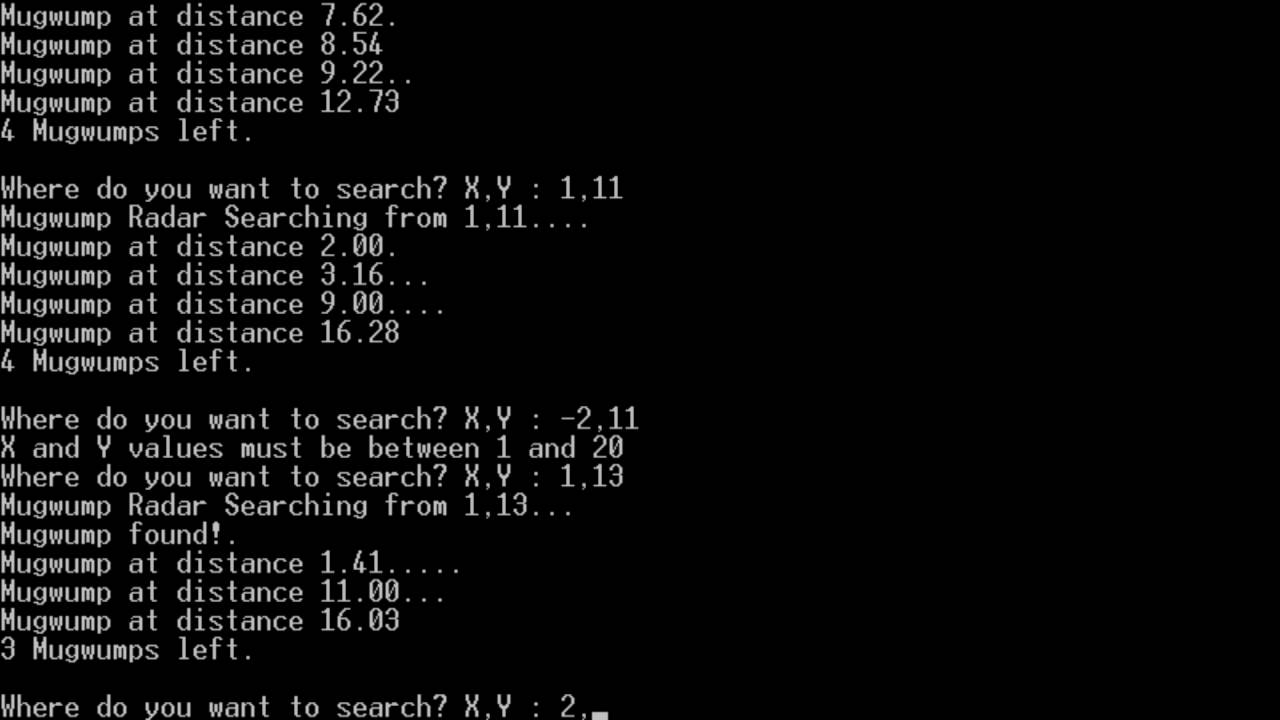
- Developer(s): Bud Valenti (and students); Bob Albrecht
- Platform(s): BASIC
- Release: April 1973
- Genre(s): Strategy game
- Mode(s): Single-player

Mugwump is an early video game where the user is tasked with finding "Mugwumps" randomly hidden on a 10×10 grid. It is a text-based game written in BASIC. It was initially written for the PDP-10 and later HP2000.

== Development ==
Mugwump was written by Bob Albrecht of the People's Computer Company and inspired by a similar program called Hide and Seek developed for the PDP-10 by students of Bud Valenti from Project SOLO in Pittsburgh, Pennsylvania. A sample run first appeared in the People's Computer Company Journal Vol. 1 No. 3 in February 1973, and source code was published in Vol. 1 No. 4 in April. Source code was again published in Vol. 3 No. 1 in September 1974. Mugwump was later included in the book BASIC Computer Games.

== Gameplay ==
The user enters a pair of single-digit co-ordinates in the range from 0 to 9 which are the x,y coordinates to scan. If the mugwump is at that location then the user is alerted. Otherwise the user is told the distance from the scanned coordinates to the mugwump. The game ends after ten turns or when the mugwump has been found.

== Legacy ==
Mugwump led to similar games such as Hurkle and later Snark. Frustration with grid based games like these led Gregory Yob to produce Hunt the Wumpus.
