= Graphtec =

Japanese multinational technology company

Graphtec Corporation
- Company type: Kabushiki-gaisha (TYO: 6968)
- Industry: Computer hardware
- Founded: 1949
- Headquarters: Tokyo, Japan
- Key people: Dr. Watanabe (Founder)
- Products: Plotters, scanners
- Website: www.graphteccorp.com

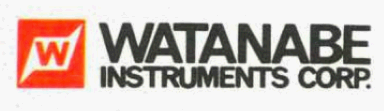
Watanabe logo

MP1000 (1983)

Graphtec Corporation (TYO: 6968), formerly Watanabe Instruments, is a company for computer input and output devices in Japan. It has subsidiaries in the USA, Europe and Australia. Graphtec was established in 1949; their first plotter was released in 1961.

== Products ==
Pen plotter

- WX4633, WX4638, WX4671, WX4675, WX4731
- MP1000

Cutting plotter

- Craft ROBO, Craft ROBO Pro
- CE 3000
- CE 5000

== Driver ==
The plotters use Graphtec Plotter Graphic Language (GP-GL) which is not compatible with HP-GL, see its EAGLE definition:

[WX4671]

Type     = PenPlotter
Long     = "Watanabe WX4671 plotter"
Init     = ""
Reset    = "M0,0\n"
Width    = 16
Height   = 11
ResX     = 254
ResY     = 254
Move     = "M%d,%d\n"
Draw     = "D%d,%d\n"
