= List of BASIC dialects =

This is an alphabetical list of BASIC dialects – interpreted and compiled variants of the BASIC programming language. Each dialect's platform(s), i.e., the computer models and operating systems, are given in parentheses along with any other significant information.

== Dialects ==
=== 0–9 ===
64K BASIC
Cross-platform, interactive, open-source interpreter for microcomputer BASIC.

=== A ===
Advanced BASIC
(a.k.a. BASIC Advanced, Advanced BASIC) (DOS on the PC) by Microsoft. Available in ROM on IBM PCs. Later disk based versions for IBM PC DOS.
AlphaBasic
Altair BASIC
(a.k.a. MITS 4K BASIC, MITS 8K BASIC, Altair Disk Extended BASIC) (Altair 8800, S-100) – Microsoft's first product
Altair Disk Extended BASIC
See Altair BASIC
Amiga BASIC (Amiga)
Somewhat easier than ABasiC, see MS BASIC for Macintosh.
AMOS BASIC (Amiga)
For the Amiga, made for game programming. A descendant of STOS BASIC on the Atari ST. Later derivatives included AMOS Professional (a.k.a. AMOS Pro) and Easy AMOS.
ANSI
Standard for the programming language Minimal BASIC X3.60-1978, a 1978 standard for minimal features, and X3.113-1987, the full BASIC standard; rarely implemented fully.
Apple BASIC (Apple I)
See: Integer BASIC
Apple Business BASIC (Apple III)
Applesoft BASIC (Apple II)
Based on the same Microsoft code that Commodore BASIC was based on. Standard on the Apple II Plus/Apple II Europlus and all later models of the Apple II family.
ASIC
(DOS on the PC)
Atari 2600 Basic Programming
(Atari 2600 video game console)
SuperCharger Disk BASIC (Atari 2600 video game console)
StarPath SuperCharger cartridge plus disk-based extensions.
Atari BASIC (Atari 8-bit)
The standard cartridge-based interpreter for the Atari 400/800 computers and successors. On later machines this was built into the ROM.
Atari Microsoft BASIC (Atari 8-bit)
ROM cartridge plus disk-based extensions.
AT&T
interpreter and compiler for the AT&T UNIX PC (3B1).
Atom BASIC (Acorn Atom)
AutoIt (Microsoft Windows)
automates other programs, e.g. with simulated mouse clicks. Interpreted. GUI. Creates EXEs.

=== B ===
B32 Business Basic
(Data General Eclipse MV, Unix, DOS)
Microsoft BASCOM
MBASIC-compatible BASIC compiler by Microsoft
BASCOM-AVR, BASCOM-8051, BASCOM-LT
BASIC compilers by Mark Alberts for the 8051 and AVR chips, see also BASCOM (BASIC compiler)
BASIC I, BASIC II, BASIC III
(see Luxor/DIAB BASIC)
BASIC 2.0
(see Commodore BASIC)
BASIC 7.0
(see Commodore BASIC)
BASIC A+
(Atari 8-bit ) – An extended BASIC by Optimized Systems Software
BASIC Advanced
See IBM BASICA
BASIC Programming
(Atari CX-2620) – A simple version of BASIC for the Atari 2600 Video Computer System
BASIC XE
(Atari 8-bit) – An enhanced version of BASIC XL, by Optimized Systems Software
BASIC XL
(Atari 8-bit) – Improved BASIC for the by Optimized Systems Software
Basic4GL
Fast interpreter meant for OpenGL graphical programming, especially games
BASIC-11
(DEC PDP-11, RSX-11)
Basic-256
(Microsoft Windows, Linux, Unix) – BASIC IDE with text and graphics output, written to introduce children to programming. Originally known as KidBASIC.
BASIC-E
(a.k.a. submarine BASIC) (CP/M)
BASIC Plus 2
(DEC PDP-11: RSTS/E, RSX-11)
BASIC-PLUS
(DEC PDP-11: RSTS/E)
BASIC09
(OS-9 and OS-9 68K on Motorola 6809 and 68K CPUs, respectively)
BASICA
(a.k.a. BASIC Advanced, Advanced BASIC) (DOS on the PC) by Microsoft. Available in ROM on IBM PCs. Later disk based versions for IBM PC DOS.
BASICODE
(Many 8-bit home computers, including KC 85) A subset common to many platform-specific BASICs, enabling interoperability.
batari BASIC
version primarily used for homebrew Atari 2600 development.
BBC BASIC
Originally for the Acorn/BBC Micro, but has since been ported to RISC OS, Tiki 100, Cambridge Z88, Amstrad NC100, CP/M, ZX Spectrum, DOS, Microsoft Windows and many others. A GPL clone of BBC BASIC named Brandy written in portable C is also available (RISC OS, NetBSD, OpenBSD, FreeBSD, Linux, macOS, AmigaOS, DOS). Also a port made for the Commodore 64 by Aztec Software, written by Julian Gardner.
Beta BASIC
BASIC toolkit that extended Sinclair BASIC.
Blitz3D
(Microsoft Windows) Fast compiler made for 3D game programming, with DirectX 7 support.
Blitz BASIC
(Amiga, Windows) – Fast compiler meant for game programming. Windows version with DirectX support. Discontinued, replaced by BlitzPlus.
BlitzMax
(macOS, Linux, Windows) – Fast and compact object-oriented compiler meant for several tasks, most notably Game programming with OpenGL and DirectX support (DirectX support is Windows only).
BlitzPlus
(Microsoft Windows) Fast compiler made for 2D game programming and WinAPI event based interpreted programming. Supports both DirectX and OpenGL.
BrightScript
Scripting language based on BASIC, used to build software for Roku OS devices and BrightSign digital display systems.
BURP
Basic Using Reverse Polish, used by the very early PSI Comp 80 "scientific computer", as published in the British radio enthusiasts magazine Wireless World
Business Basic
name given collectively to BASIC variants which were specialized for business use on minicomputers in the 1970s.

=== C ===
CA-Realizer
dialect similar to VisualBasic by Computer Associates, last version 3.0, no longer under development/supported
Casio BASIC
used in Casio calculators
Cassette BASIC
An interpreter on IBM and IBM-compatible PCs to which the machine will default if no operating system is detected.
CBASIC (CP/M, DOS)
BASIC-E successor.
CBASIC
standard interpreter for 8-bit SORD computers (M23, M68 in Z80 mode, etc.), a.k.a. APU BASIC when the arithmetic processor is installed
Chinese BASIC
Several Chinese-translated BASIC versions developed in the early 1980s.
Chipmunk Basic
(Apple Macintosh, CLI ports for Win32, Linux) – copyrighted freeware
Color BASIC
(Tandy, RadioShack TRS-80 Color Computer)
Commodore BASIC
(a.k.a. CBM BASIC) (Various computers in CBM's line of 8-bit computers) – Integrated in the ROM of CBM 8-bit computers. Built on an early version of 6502 Microsoft BASIC. Several versions existed; the best-known was Commodore Basic V2, as used in the Commodore 64.
Compaq BASIC for OpenVMS
DEC BASIC, renamed after DEC was acquired by Compaq. Now named VSI BASIC for OpenVMS.

=== D ===
Dartmouth BASIC
the original BASIC version. It was a compiler. Later versions included MAT statements for matrix operations. See also True BASIC.
Data General Business Basic
(Data General Nova and later DG minicomputers)
DEC BASIC
Formerly VAX BASIC; renamed after VAX/VMS was ported to Alpha processors and renamed OpenVMS. Now named VSI BASIC for OpenVMS due to corporate acquisitions.

=== E ===
Extended Color BASIC
(TRS-80 Color Computer and Dragon 32/64)

=== F ===
Famicom BASIC
(Nintendo Entertainment System) – For the Nintendo Entertainment System.
FreeBASIC
(DOS (DPMI32), MS Windows, Xbox, Linux, FreeBSD) – An open-source (GPL) BASIC compiler, that employs a similar syntax to QuickBASIC's, with more advanced features like pointers and object-oriented programming. It also supports a dialect specially designed to be compatible with QuickBASIC.
FutureBASIC
(macOS) – Free compiled, procedural, provides access to Carbon API (Mac OS Toolbox), GUI and file system of System 6 to macOS
FUZE BASIC
(MS Windows, Linux, Nintendo Switch) – Highly modernized adaptation of classic BASIC also deployed on custom Raspberry Pi machines.

=== G ===
Galaksija BASIC
(Galaksija) – Firmware version for Galaksija home computer.
Gambas
(Linux, Unix, Cygwin) – A rapid application development environment for BASIC on Linux by Benoît Minisini. Similar approach as Visual Basic.
GFA BASIC
(Atari ST, Amiga, DOS, Windows) – Originally conceived on the Atari ST where it became one of the most popular BASICs for that platform (it almost became a standard language for the Atari ST). Was later ported to the Amiga, DOS and Windows.
GLBasic
(main target platforms: Windows, Linux, Apple iPhone, Pocket PC. IDE environment: Windows) – optimized for games
GW-BASIC
(DOS and Windows) by Microsoft. BASICA compatible; independent of IBM ROM routines. Came with versions of MS-DOS before 5.0. Included music macro language and advanced loops.

=== H ===
HP BASIC for OpenVMS
Originally VAX BASIC; renamed to DEC BASIC after VAX/VMS was ported from VAX to Alpha processors; renamed to Compaq BASIC after Compaq acquired DEC; renamed to HP BASIC for OpenVMS name after HP acquired Compaq. Now known as VSI BASIC for OpenVMS.
HP Time-Shared BASIC
(HP 2100 line of minicomputers)
HTBasic
Version of Rocky Mountain BASIC by TransEra

=== I ===
IBM Cassette BASIC
(PC) – Built into the first IBM PCs. Ran independently of DOS and used audio cassettes as a storage medium.
Integer BASIC
(Apple II) – Steve Wozniak's own creation. Originally known simply as "Apple BASIC". For the BASICs available at the time, it was very fast and memory-efficient. Only supported integers. Came as standard on the Apple I and original Apple II

=== J ===
JR-BASIC
used on the Matsushita JR series home computers

=== L ===
Liberty BASIC
(Windows, Macintosh, Linux) – Traditional structured BASIC with extensions for desktop GUI programming.
Locomotive BASIC
(Amstrad CPC, Amstrad NC100) – built into the ROM, (ZX Spectrum +3) on CP/M disk
LotusScript
(IBM Lotus Notes)
Luxor/DIAB BASIC
BASIC I

(Luxor ABC 80 in ROM) – Semicompiled to byte code for speed, decimal floating point, support for bignum arithmetic

BASIC II

(Luxor ABC 800/Facit DTC in ROM, IBM PC on MS-DOS disk, several ports to ABC 80) – Faster byte code, long variable names, partial support for structured programming, binary floating point, API for third-party extensions

BASIC III

(Luxor ABC 1600 and ABC 9000, DIAB DS series on DNIX disk) – 32-bit support (Motorola 68000), structured programming, integrated Mimer database support

=== M ===
MacBASIC
Apple's original BASIC for the Macintosh, released as Beta software and discontinued due to a deal with Microsoft
MAI Basic Four Business Basic
(misc. minicomputers)
Mallard BASIC
(Amstrad PCW, ZX Spectrum +3 on CP/M) – Similar to Locomotive BASIC
MapBasic
procedural language used specifically for GIS programs.
MBASIC
(CP/M) – Further development of OBASIC, also by Microsoft. MBasic was one of the BASICs developed by Microsoft. Came with a line editor.
Microsoft BASIC
many versions for several different CPUs and system architectures exist, and many other BASICs are derivatives of some Microsoft BASIC
Microsoft Small Basic
Microsoft Level III BASIC
(Tandy / RadioShack TRS-80)
Mobile BASIC
(Java enabled mobile phones)
MS BASIC for Macintosh
(macOS)
MSX BASIC
(MSX) – by Microsoft

=== N ===
NorthStar BASIC
(Processor Technology, NorthStar Horizon, later adapted to x86 as Bazic '86) and S.A.I.L.B.O.A.T. (a basic optimized for Z80 and X86 MS-DOS)
NS Basic
(Newton OS, Symbian OS, Palm OS, Windows CE, Windows Mobile, Microsoft Windows ) – IDE and Bytecode-interpreter

=== O ===
Oasis Basic
see THEOS Multi-User Basic
OBASIC
(CP/M) – by Microsoft
Open Programming Language OPL
(Symbian OS phones and PDAs) – Originally developed for Psion's product line of organisers and PDAs. OPL used to stand for Organiser Programming Language but after becoming open source in 2003, it was renamed. Available for most of Psion's classic organisers and PDAs, Nokia 9210/9290/9300/9500 Communicators and Sony Ericsson P800/P900/P910.

=== P ===
PBASIC
for use with the Parallax BASIC Stamp microcontroller
PowerBASIC
(DOS, Win16, Win32) – free and commercial compilers for DOS and Windows, which focus on fast compile speeds and small binaries. They are Turbo Basic successors.
Processor Technology
5 KB and 8 KB BASICs. Created for the SOL-20 computer, but widely ported to other platforms as Processor Technology published the 8080 source code. Nevada BASIC (CP/M) and Utah BASIC [MS-DOS] were the latest ports.
Professional Development System (PDS)
A superset of Microsoft QuickBASIC targeted at professional software developers.
PureBasic
(Microsoft Windows (x86, x64), Linux (x86, x64), AmigaOS, macOS (x64, arm64 Apple silicon) and Raspberry Pi (arm32, arm64)) – Cross-platform program development language, 32 & 64bit. Fast compiler with many functions that creates fast and small standalone native executables which do not require runtime DLLs. It compiles with FASM or a C compiler, and has inline support.

=== Q ===
QB64
(Windows, Linux and macOS) – Self-hosting BASIC compiler for Microsoft Windows, Linux and macOS. Aims at full compatibility with Microsoft QBasic and QuickBASIC. BASIC code is translated to C++ and then compiled to executable form. An event driven GUI builder named InForm exists for QB64.
QBasic
(DOS on the PC) – by Microsoft. Subset of QuickBASIC. Came with versions of MS-DOS from 5.0 to 6.22. Also included with DOS 7 (what Windows 95 runs on,) and available from the install CD of Windows 98.
QuickBASIC
(DOS on the PC) by Microsoft. An evolution of BASICA/GW-BASIC to block-structured lexical syntax that does not require line numbers, with many added intrinsic functions and language features (e.g. loop and conditional control constructs, file modes, and mixed-language programming support). Has an integrated development environment, intended to compete with Borland Turbo language products (e.g. Turbo BASIC and especially the contemporarily popular Turbo Pascal). Mostly backward-compatible with BASICA source code. Includes a compiler and linker, and produces MS-DOS executables. Released in versions 1.0, 2.0. 3.0. 4.0, & 4.5. QuickBASIC 4.5 was released in 1988. The QuickBASIC 4.5 IDE includes an interpreter, syntax checking, debugging aids, and online help including a full language reference.

=== R ===
RapidQ
(Windows, Linux, Solaris/SPARC and HP-UX) – Free, borrowed from Visual Basic. Useful for graphical interfaces. Works mainly with QuickBASIC instructions. (Cross-platform, free, no longer being developed). Semi-OO interpreter. Includes RAD IDE.
Rocky Mountain BASIC
created by HP to control instruments through HP-IB

=== S ===
S-BASIC
"Structured" BASIC, came with Kaypro CP/M systems
SAM BASIC
(SAM Coupé)
sdlBasic
Free, multiplatform, based on core of wxBasic, but uses the SDL library.
Simons' BASIC
A cartridge-based utility that added 114 additional keywords to the standard BASIC 2.0 on the Commodore 64 computer
Sinclair BASIC
(ZX80, ZX81/TS1000, ZX Spectrum, Timex Sinclair 2068, Ringo R470, Lambda 8300)
SmallBASIC
(Android, Windows, Linux, DOS, Palm OS, etc.) – A small open-source GPL-ed interpreter.
Small Basic
(Windows) – by Microsoft DevLabs Team.
SmartBASIC
(Coleco Adam)
SmileBASIC
A retro dialect of BASIC used in Petit Computer (for the DSi) and SmileBASIC (for the 3DS)
SOBS
(ICT 1900 series) Southampton BASIC System
StarBasic
StarOffice Basic
StarOffice Basic
(a.k.a. StarBasic) (OpenOffice.org, StarOffice)
ST BASIC (Atari)
(Atari ST) – This came with the Atari ST
STOS BASIC
(Atari ST) – For Atari ST made for game programming. Predecessor of AMOS BASIC on the Amiga.
SuperBASIC
(Sinclair QL)

=== T ===
Tektronix
For the 4050 series computers, extensive graphics commands
TeleBASIC
Dartmouth BASIC variant for the Telehack simulation. Various extensions for Telehack platform operations
THEOS Multi-User Basic
(THEOS operating system)
TI BASIC
(note: no hyphen) (TI-99/4A)
TI Extended BASIC
(TI-99/4A)
TI-BASIC
(note: hyphen) (Texas Instruments programmable calculators)
Tiny BASIC
(any microcomputer, but mostly implemented on early S-100 bus machines) – Minimalist version which source code was smaller than this article, used on low-memory platforms.
TRS-80 Level I BASIC
(TRS-80) – based on Tiny BASIC.
TRS-80 Level II BASIC
(Tandy / RadioShack TRS-80) – based on Microsoft BASIC
True BASIC
(DOS, Windows, macOS, Linux, Unix) – Direct descendant of the original BASIC, Dartmouth BASIC, marketed by its creators. Strictly standards-compliant.
Turbo-Basic XL
(Atari 8-bit) – Freeware interpreter and compilerbased on Atari BASIC. Even this slower interpreter was about four times faster than the built-in BASIC. Written by Frank Ostrowski, the person who then developed GFA BASIC. Came from Happy Computer.
Tymshare SuperBasic
(SDS 940)

=== U ===
UBASIC
(DOS on the PC) – Interpreter with many mathematical routines. Strong emphasis on number theory. Can work with many-digit numbers, complex numbers.
UniVerse
dialect that is part of the UniVerse database, with strong focus on data access and manipulation.

=== V ===
VAX BASIC
DEC's BASIC-Plus-2 ported to VAX/VMS
VBScript
(a.k.a. VBS, Visual Basic Script, Visual Basic Scripting Edition) – A subset of Visual Basic used in ASP, Internet Explorer, or under Windows using the Windows Script Host (WSH) as a general-purpose scripting language. VBScript is often used as a replacement for DOS batch files.
Vilnius BASIC
(Elektronika BK-0010-01, BK-0011M and UKNC computers)
Visual Basic
(Windows) – Microsoft's object-oriented dialect with rapid application development environment.
Visual Basic .NET
(Windows) – Version within the .NET Framework by Microsoft.
Visual Basic for Applications
(a.k.a. VBA) (Microsoft Office on MS Windows and Apple Macintosh)
Visual Basic Script
See VBScript
Visual Basic Scripting Edition
See VBScript
Visual Test
(Originally MS-TEST) – Basic in Visual Test
VSI BASIC for OpenVMS
Originally released as VAX BASIC by Digital Equipment Corporation, owned by VMS Software Inc. (VSI) since 2014. Runs on the OpenVMS operating system.

=== W ===
WordBasic
versions of Microsoft Word before MS Word 97
wxBasic
Open-source GPL interpreter based on the platform independent wxWidgets toolkit library. For Linux, macOS (proposed), and Windows.

=== X ===
XBasic
(Windows, Linux) – open-source compiler with a GUI designer
XBLite
(Windows) – open-source compiler with integrated editor
Xojo
(MacOS, Linux, Windows, iOS, Raspberry Pi and Web) – Platform independent BASIC. Object-oriented Visual Basic-like Basic variant. Formerly known as REALbasic.

=== Y ===
Yabasic
(Linux, Windows and PlayStation 2) Small interpreter. (GPL)
yab
(BeOS, Zeta, Haiku) Adaptation of Yabasic that enables the creation of graphical programs using the BeOS API.

=== Z ===
ZBasic (Zedcor Zbasic)
first released by Zedcor (Tucson, Arizona) in mid-1985. Versions were made for Apple, DOS, Macintosh CP/M and TRS-80 computers. In 1991, 32 Bit Software Inc. (Dallas, Texas) bought the DOS version and expanded it. Zedcor concentrated on the Apple Mac market and renamed it FutureBASIC. ZBasic was very fast, efficient and advanced, with BCD math precision up to 54 digits.

== BASIC extensions ==
BASIC extensions (a.k.a. BASIC toolkits) extend a particular BASIC.

(Platforms: APCW = Amstrad PCW; A8 = Atari 8-bit; C64 = Commodore 64; C128 = Commodore 128; Spec+3 = ZX Spectrum +3; VIC-20)

- BASIC 8 (C128) – Third-party extension of the C128's Commodore BASIC 7.0
- Beta BASIC (ZX Spectrum)
- BASIC XL Toolkit (A8) – Disk-based extension of Optimized Systems Software (OSS) BASIC XL for Atari 8-bit
- YS MegaBasic (ZX Spectrum)
- Simons' BASIC (C64) – CBM-marketed improved BASIC for the C64, loaded from disk or ROM cartridge
- Super Expander (VIC-20) – CBM's own cartridge based extension of the VIC-20's Commodore BASIC 2.0
- Super Expander 64 (C64) – CBM's own cartridge based extension of the VIC-20's Commodore BASIC 2.0, for the C64

== See also ==
- ALGOL
- COMAL
- Euphoria (programming language)
- FORTRAN
- Open Programming Language
- List of compilers § BASIC interpreters
