= Realizer =

Realizer or realiser may refer to:

- Realizer in mathematical order dimension
- Realizer in mathematical realizability
- CA-Realizer, a BASIC-language software development product
- "Realizer", a song by the Crystal Method from their 2004 album Legion of Boom
- Realizer, a fictional device in the light novel series Date A Live

== See also ==
- Realization (disambiguation)
