= MacBASIC =

Programming language for the Mac

- Original authors: Donn Denman, Marianne Hsiung, Larry Kenyon, Bryan Stearns
- Developer: Apple Computer
- Release: 1985; 41 years ago
- Platform: Classic Mac OS
- Type: Programming tools
- License: Proprietary

MacBASIC was a programming language and interactive environment designed by Apple Computer for the original Macintosh computer. It was developed by original Macintosh team member Donn Denman, with help from fellow Apple programmers Marianne Hsiung, Larry Kenyon, and Bryan Stearns, as part of the original Macintosh development effort starting in late 1981. Andy Hertzfeld said, "A BASIC interpreter would be important, to allow users to write their own programs. We decided we should write it ourselves, instead of relying on a third party, because it was important for the BASIC programs to be able to take advantage of the Macintosh UI, and we didn't trust a third party to 'get it' enough to do it right."

MacBASIC was released as beta software in 1985, and was adopted for use in places such as the Dartmouth College computer science department, for use in an introductory programming course. In August 1985, Apple abruptly ended the project, annoying book publishers that had published three books on the language with cooperation from the company. Apple discontinued MacBASIC as part of a deal with Microsoft to extend the license for Applesoft BASIC on the Apple II. Although Apple retracted MacBASIC, unlicensed copies of the software and manual still circulated, but because MacBASIC was no longer supported by Apple and was not designed to be 32-bit clean, interest eventually died out.

Benchmarks published in Washington Apple Pi Journal suggested that MacBASIC had better performance as compared to Microsoft's MS BASIC for Macintosh. The language included modern looping control structures, user-defined functions, graphics, and access to the Macintosh Toolbox. The development environment supported multiple programs running simultaneously with symbolic debugging including breakpoints and single-step execution.
