= Realize =

Realize or realise may refer to:

- Realize, an album by Eri Kitamura
- Realize, an album by Karsh Kale
- Realize (album), a 1989 album by Hideaki Tokunaga
- "Realize", a song by 2 Chainz from their album Pretty Girls Like Trap Music
- "Realize", a song by AC/DC from their 2020 album Power Up
- "Realize", a song by Codeine, from their EP Barely Real
- "Realize" (Colbie Caillat song), 2008
- "Realize" (Konomi Suzuki song), 2020
- "Realize", a song by Nami Tamaki from her 2004 album Greeting
- "Realise", a song by The Screaming Jets, from their 2000 album Scam
- "Realize/Take a Chance", a 2005 song by Melody
- "Realize", a song by Bad Gyal from her 2018 album Worldwide Angel

== See also ==
- Realization (disambiguation)
