= Realization =

Realization or realisation may refer to:

- Realization (Eddie Henderson album), a 1973 album by Eddie Henderson
- Realization (Johnny Rivers album), a 1968 album by Johnny Rivers
- Realization (climb), a sport climbing route in Ceüse, France
- Realization (figured bass), the creating of a musical accompaniment from a figured bass
- Realization (finance), the pricing of security at market value
- Realization (linguistics), the production of an actual form in a human language from an abstract representation
- Realization (metrology), a physical form of a measurement standard
- Realization (probability), an actually observed value of random variable
- Realization (systems), a state space model implementing a given input-output behavior
- Realization (tax), one of the principles for defining income for tax purposes in the U.S.
- Realization of an apeirogon, a mapping of an abstract apeirogon
- "Realization" (Tales of the Empire), an episode of Tales of the Empire

== See also ==
- Realize (disambiguation)
- Realizer (disambiguation)
- Self-realization, a psychological or spiritual change in one's sense of self
