= Petit Computer =

- Developer: SmileBoom
- Publishers: Nintendo DSi: JP: SmileBoom; WW: GameBridge; Nintendo 3DS, Wii U, Nintendo Switch: WW: SmileBoom
- Platforms: Nintendo DSi; Nintendo 3DS; Wii U Nintendo Switch
- Release: Nintendo DSi: JP: March 9, 2011; NA: July 19, 2012; EU: July 25, 2013; Nintendo 3DS: JP: November 19, 2014; NA: October 15, 2015; EU: August 17, 2017; Wii U: JP: December 14, 2016; Nintendo Switch: JP: May 23, 2019; WW: April 23, 2020
- Genre: Software development application
- Mode: Single-player

Petit Computer is a software development application for the Nintendo DSi and later systems, developed by SmileBoom in Sapporo, Japan. The application is built around a custom dialect of BASIC known as SmileBASIC (not to be confused with the 3DS sequel with the same name). Users can write games and other software using the onscreen keyboard and run the applications from within Petit Computer. The platform supports text-based console applications, visual applications, and any combination of the two. Input is available via hardware buttons, touchscreen input, or the onscreen keyboard.

In addition to the code editor and interpreter, Petit Computer includes a simple shell for file management, as well as file sharing functionality. Files can be shared by a direct wireless connection between two DS systems, or by the use of QR codes.

The usage of QR codes enabled some users to develop desktop software that can be used to write SmileBASIC and generate a QR code for easy transfer to the DS.

Petit Computer comes with several simple sample applications, 5 sample games, and several graphics-editing applications, all written in SmileBASIC with viewable source code. The latter applications can be used to create sprites, backgrounds, and other resources that can then be used within user-created software. Hundreds of premade sprites and tiles are included with Petit Computer. An extensive manual is available from within Petit that describes the basic features and limitations of SmileBASIC, as well as brief descriptions of most of the commands and their syntax.

The Nintendo DSi application was released in Japan as PetitCom (プチコン) on March 9, 2011 and PetitCom mkII (プチコンmkII) on March 14, 2012. The latter was released internationally by GameBridge as Petit Computer on July 19, 2012 in North America and July 25, 2013 in Europe.

== SmileBASIC language ==
Petit Computer uses a customized dialect of BASIC known as SmileBASIC designed specifically for the DSi. Applications written in SmileBASIC can read input from all of the DS's hardware buttons except the Select button (which is always used to terminate the current application) as well as the touch screen, draw graphics and sprites to both screens, and play music written in Music Macro Language. Standard console commands are provided for reading, writing, and manipulating strings. An exhaustive set of graphical commands exists for displaying and manipulating sprites, background graphics, panels, and more, with support for layering, translation, rotation, scaling, palette swapping, and other features, on both screens (some features are limited on the touch screen). Up to 16 channels can be used to play simultaneous audio, with support for fully featured user-defined software instruments and sequenced music.

== Reception ==
Nintendo Life gave the application 7/10 stars, praising its power and potential, but criticizing the presentation as tailored towards seasoned programmers, as well as the "tedious" method of entering code via the touch-screen keyboard. Peter Willington at PocketGamer said the interface "puts you off experimenting" due to the difficulties in entering and navigating text, and complained that error messages weren't useful, but described himself as "massively proud" of his accomplishments with the software and wrote that "experienced hands will be able to make any kind of software they like".

== Sequels ==
A sequel designed for the Nintendo 3DS, with new features and fewer limitations, released on November 19, 2014 in Japan; October 15, 2015 in North America; and August 17, 2017 in Europe. The sequel is titled SmileBASIC (the same name as the dialect of BASIC used in both applications) or PetitCom 3 SmileBASIC (プチコン３号 SmileBASIC) in Japan. Nintendo Life gave the application 8/10 stars, praising the removal of QR codes and the power of the language, but again criticizing the cumbersome keyboard. Projects are shared online, with users getting the ability to share up to 10 files at 4 MB each, and can subscribe to a Gold Membership to increase the limit to 110 files at 20 MB each. In 2015, it was announced that SmileBASIC would be ported to the Wii U as PetitCom BIG (プチコンBIG). It was going to be released internationally, but that never materialized and as a result it’s only available in Japan.

The 3DS version of the program was removed from the North American eShop on July 11, 2016 due to an exploit that existed in between versions 3.2.1 and up to version 3.3.1 of the program. The exploit was fixed in version 3.3.2 of the application, and as a result SmileBASIC was put back up for sale on the North American eShop on August 10, 2016. As of system version 11.1.0-X released September 12, 2016, when trying to load the game, the system does not allow users to launch the title until the software is updated to version 3.3.2 or higher, forcing users to download the patch, rendering the exploit unusable even if the older version of the game is available.

Another sequel designed for the Nintendo Switch, titled SmileBASIC 4 or PetitCom 4 SmileBASIC (プチコン4 SmileBASIC), released in Japan on May 23, 2019 and released internationally on April 23, 2020. As well as taking advantage of the functions of the Nintendo Switch hardware, such as the Joy-Con controllers and the USB ports on the dock for keyboard and mouse support, the online sharing function now utilises "server tickets" instead of an ongoing subscription for uploaded programs and games, where each ticket purchased increases the amount of online storage you have. SmileBASIC 4 can be purchased as a bundle with one server ticket, or just as the software alone. A free trial version of SmileBASIC 4 is also available in Japan.

Shortly after releasing, the international version of SmileBASIC 4 was temporarily pulled from sale in some areas as SmileBoom discussed ratings with the IARC for two sample programs in the software, GAME_RPG and GAME_SHOOTER. The international version remained on sale in the United States, Canada, and Mexico during this period. SmileBASIC 4 was put back up for sale on June 18, 2020. SmileBASIC 4 was removed from sale for all regions on October 22, 2026 following the discovery of an exploit for the Nintendo Switch 2. The game was eventually put back up for sale following an update that patches the exploit on November 20, 2026.
