= Yabasic =

Interpreter for BASIC software

- Yabasic running an implementation of SameGame
- Developer: Marc-Oliver Ihm
- Stable release: 2.91.4 / 31 August 2025; 14 months ago
- Platform: x86, MIPS (EE)
- OS: Microsoft Windows, Unix, PS2
- License: MIT License
- Filename extensions: .bas,.yab
- Website: www.yabasic.de github.com/marcIhm/yabasic

Yabasic (Yet Another BASIC) is a free, open-source BASIC interpreter for Microsoft Windows and Unix platforms. Yabasic was originally developed by Marc-Oliver Ihm. From version 2.77.1, the project adopted the MIT License and the source code was moved to GitHub to encourage others to participate in its development.

== Features ==
- No compulsory line numbers (they can be used but are optional)
- Line graphics in color
- Structured programming—various block structures, named subroutines with local variables and return values
- Code modules/libraries with separate namespaces (On the other hand, composite data structures are missing)
- Option to use a graphical user interface based on the GTK library
- Self-modifying code
- "Binding" a Yabasic program to the interpreter, creating a standalone executable in a single file

== Other versions ==
=== Yab ===
A version optimized for BeOS, ZETA and Haiku.

=== Flyab ===
A port of Yabasic to the Fltk toolkit called "Flyab" was under development. It would have been source-compatible with programs written in yab, a variant of Yabasic that enables graphical programs to be written using the BeOS API. After BeOS and its successor ZETA finally were gone, the team members around yab for BeOS decided to move to Linux and therefore chose FLTK to implement the UI parts. Ports for Microsoft Windows, Mac OS X, and Linux would have been possible. Flyab added the ability to Yabasic to create native graphical user interfaces on all supported platforms. Main difficulty was to fully implement the layout commands to FLTK, as used from the BeOS version. As of November 2008, the project appears to be halted.

=== PlayStation 2 ===
Sony also packaged a version of Yabasic for the PlayStation 2 on the demo disc shipped with PS2 consoles in PAL territories so it could be considered a home computer, not just a games machine, thus bypassing European import taxes.

=== Yabasic 3.0 (Unofficial) ===
As a continuation of the project prior to new changes by the original author, version 3 was being developed by a team centered on Pedro Sá and Thomas Larsen, but development has halted and the project now appears to be abandoned.

== Yabasic example ==
#!/usr/bin/yabasic

REM Program Name: cbm-mtudemo.yab
REM Author: mtu
REM 
REM Purpose: demonstration for their CBM-PET graphics card 320x200

open window 320, 200

20 P=160: Q=100
30 XP=144: XR=1.5*3.1415927
40 YP=56: YR=1: ZP=64
50 XF=XR/XP: YF=YP/YR: ZF=XR/ZP
60 FOR ZI=-Q TO Q-l
70 IF ZI<-ZP OR ZI>ZP GOTO 150
80 ZT=ZI*XP/ZP: ZZ=ZI
90 XL=INT(0.5+SQRT(XP*XP-ZT*ZT))
100 FOR XI=-XL TO XL
110 XT=SQRT(XI*XI+ZT*ZT)*XF: XX=XI
120 YY=(SIN(XT)+0.4*SIN(3.0*XT))*YF
130 GOSUB 170
140 NEXT XI
150 NEXT ZI
160 PAUSE 10
END
170 X1=XX+ZZ+P
180 Y1=YY-ZZ+Q:Y1=199-Y1
190 LINE X1,Y1,X1,Y1-1
200 IF Y1=0 GOTO 220
210 CLEAR LINE X1,Y1+1,X1,199
220 RETURN
