= Chipmunk Basic =

Freeware interpreter for the BASIC programming language

Chipmunk Basic is a freeware interpreter for the BASIC programming language maintained by Ron Nicholson. Chipmunk basic was originally developed for the Macintosh and publicly released in 1992. It has been ported to Linux and Windows. The "windowed" Mac version includes agraphics drawing commands. It also has object-oriented capabilities.

The current version of Chipmunk Basic (and its spinoff products for Palm OS, cBasPad and HotPaw BASIC) is based on a public domain, Pascal implementation by David Gillespie.

In January 2015, a Cocoa version was released that may lack features from the older Carbon-based OS X port. The most recent release is Version 1.368.2210, published Nov 11, 2022.

== External links and/or references ==
- Official website
- Public domain source code for the original Chipmunk Basic
- Category:Chipmunk Basic Tasks implemented in Chipmunk Basic on rosettacode.org
