= PSI Comp 80 =

The PSI Comp 80 was a home computer sold by Powertran starting in 1979. It was sold in the form of a kit of parts for a cased single-board home computer system.

The system was based on a Z80 microprocessor addressing a mixture of 8 KB of system RAM and EPROM, plus 2 KB of video RAM.

It used a National Semiconductor MM57109N as a mathematical co-processor to speed up calculations.

== History and specifications ==
In 1979, the British magazine Wireless World published the technical details for a "Scientific Computer". Shortly afterward the British firm Powertran used this design for their implementation, which they called the PSI Comp 80.

Ahead of its time, it incorporated a number crunching coprocessor and a novel language embedded in EPROM called Basic Using Reverse Polish - BURP.

The monochrome Video Display Controller could simultaneously display combinations of 32 lines of 64 characters, and 128 x 64 resolution graphics by either displaying a normal character or a "pseudo graphics" character, with pixel blocks in a 2x2 matrix. A technique similar to the one used in the TRS-80 - It could later be expanded to a higher resolution, although never to colour.

Add-ons were developed for the system, including memory expansions, floppy and hard disk interfaces, various software packages and a disk operating system, SCIDOS, which was CP/M-compatible but also included features - structured (pathed) disk folders, etc. - now very familiar to modern-day PC users.

During the mid-1980s, the designer of this system, John Adams M.SC., published a new version of the Scientific Computer - the SC84 (Scientific Computer of 1984). It was based upon a backplane and plug-in cards and modules and featuring a Hitachi HD64180 processor, up to 512 kbytes of RAM and a high-resolution colour graphics system.
