= ZBasic =

Compiler for the BASIC programming language

- ZBasic 4.7 (MS-DOS)
- Original authors: Andrew Gariepy; Scott Terry; David Overton; Greg Branche; Halbert Laing
- Developer: Simutek
- Release: 1980; 46 years ago
- Platform: MS-DOS, Apple II, Mac, CP/M, TRS-80

ZBasic is a compiler for the BASIC programming language, with an integrated development environment, released by Simutek (of Tucson, Arizona) in 1980. The combined efforts of Andrew Gariepy, Scott Terry, David Overton, Greg Branche, and Halbert Laing led to versions for MS-DOS, Apple II, Mac, CP/M, and TRS-80 computers. It can be used as a cross-platform development system, where the same source code can be compiled to different platforms without any modifications. In the late 1980s, ZBASIC was maintained and sold by Zedcor.

In 1991, Harry Gish and 32 Bit Software of Dallas, Texas purchased the MS-DOS version. Nando Favaro expanded it to include 16- and 32-bit-specific machine code as well as VGA and VESA video. Zedcor concentrated on the Mac market and renamed it FutureBASIC.

== Features ==
ZBasic uses device independent graphics where the same compiled code can work on different display resolutions and colors–even in text mode. Original MS-DOS versions include graphical support up to EGA.

ZBasic supports binary-coded decimal math with precision up to 54 digits.

INDEX$ is an array of variable length strings that can be easily sorted and searched.
