= Mobile BASIC =

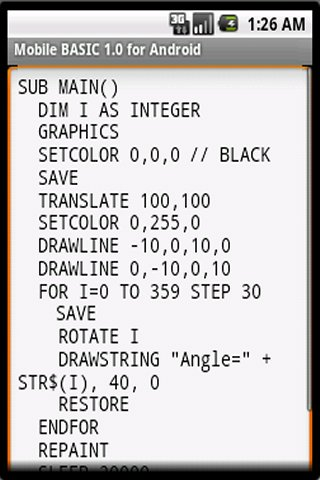
Mobile BASIC running on Android.

Mobile BASIC is a proprietary dialect of the BASIC programming language that can be used to program Java-enabled mobile phones. This is possible because the interpreter is a MIDlet.
