= MS BASIC for Macintosh =

- Developer: Microsoft
- Release: 1984; 42 years ago
- Platform: Classic Mac OS
- Type: Microsoft BASIC
- License: Proprietary

MS BASIC for Macintosh was a dialect of Microsoft BASIC for Macintosh. It was one of the first Microsoft BASIC variants to have optional line numbering, predating QuickBASIC. It was provided in two versions, one with standard binary floating point and another with decimal arithmetic.
