= Copy Fail =

Computer security vulnerability (2026)

CVE-2026-31431
- CVSS 3.x score: 7.8
- CVSS 3.x vector: CVSS:3.1/AV:L/AC:L/PR:L/UI:N/S:U/C:H/I:H/A:H
- Date of public disclosure: April 29, 2026; 5 months ago
- Discoverer: Taeyang Lee (Theori)
- Affected software: Linux kernel
- Website: copy.fail

CVE-2026-31431, commonly known as Copy Fail, is a vulnerability in the Linux kernel that allows unauthorized privilege escalation, disclosed by security firm Theori to the public on 29 April 2026 and to the Linux kernel security team five weeks prior. The exploit blends into normal system activity via standard system calls and may be raised through 10 lines of Python.

== Characteristics ==
The vulnerability lets an unprivileged user make use of the address family AF_ALG in the Crypto API of the Linux kernel to perform controlled 4‑byte writes into the page cache, which backs the in‑memory copies of files.

By replacing code in the in‑memory copy of a readable executable stored in the page cache, an attacker can escalate user privileges when any privileged process later runs that corrupted version of the file. As most Linux utilities for changing users (e.g. su) run as privileged using setuid, the user privilege escalation surface is large.

== Affected software ==
Every Linux distribution using Linux kernel versions between 4.14 (2017) and 6.19.12 is at risk. Debian, Ubuntu, SUSE, Red Hat Enterprise Linux, and other Linux distributions were affected.

Many distributions and security sources recommended mitigating the issue via disabling the affected algif_aead kernel module. Some distributions—such as Arch Linux, Fedora, and Amazon Linux—had released patches at the time of the disclosure, but the vulnerability was disclosed by Theori before the affected distributions they advertised as vulnerable had released patches. As of 30 April 2026, SUSE, Red Hat, and Ubuntu have released mitigation guidance. As of May 5, detection rules from Kaspersky Lab have been added.

MAC mechanisms such as SELinux and AppArmor can mitigate the exploit, but only when they are configured so that only legitimately required services are granted access to the AF_ALG socket family. In default configurations, any unconfined or broadly permitted process can still open AF_ALG sockets, so the protection is effectively absent and the exploit remains reachable.

According to GrapheneOS, Android is unaffected due to its use of SELinux policies, where only the dumpstate process (used for bug reports) is permitted to create AF_ALG sockets.
