= Tomoyo Linux =

Linux kernel security module

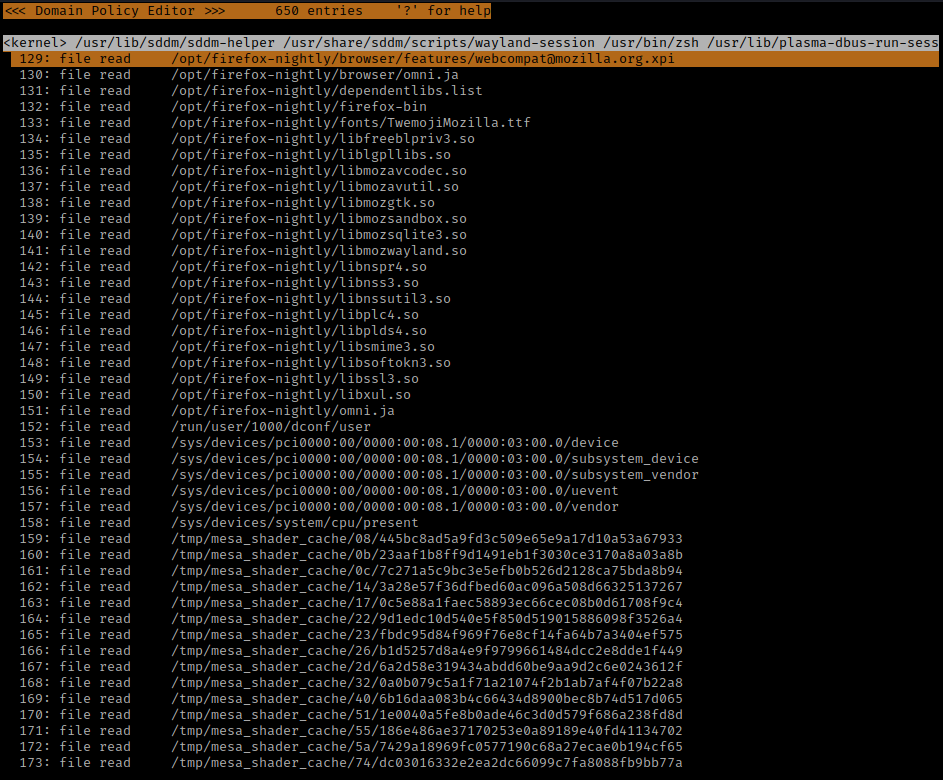
- Tomoyo Linux 2.x Domain Policy Editor
- Original author(s): NTT Data Corporation
- Repository: svn.osdn.net/svnroot/tomoyo/
- Operating system: Linux
- Type: Mandatory access control
- License: GPLv2
- Website: tomoyo.sourceforge.net

Tomoyo Linux (stylised as TOMOYO Linux) is a Linux kernel security module which implements mandatory access control (MAC).

== Overview ==
Tomoyo Linux is a MAC implementation for Linux that can be used to increase the security of a system, while also being useful purely as a systems analysis tool. It was launched in March 2003 and was sponsored by NTT Data Corporation until March 2012.

Tomoyo Linux focuses on system behaviour. Tomoyo Linux allows each process to declare behaviours and resources needed to achieve their purpose. When protection is enabled, Tomoyo Linux restricts each process to the behaviours and resources allowed by the administrator.

== Features ==
The main features of Tomoyo Linux include:

- System analysis
- Increased security through Mandatory Access Control
- Automatic policy generation
- Simple syntax
- Ease of use

== History and versions ==
Tomoyo was merged in Linux Kernel mainline version 2.6.30 (2009, June 10)/ It is currently one of four standard Linux Security Modules (LSM), along with SELinux, AppArmor and SMACK.

The Tomoyo Linux project started as a patch for the Linux kernel to provide MAC. Porting Tomoyo Linux to the mainline Linux kernel required the introduction of hooks into the LSM that had been designed and developed specifically to support SELinux and its label-based approach.

However, more hooks are needed to integrate the remaining MAC functionality of Tomoyo Linux. Consequently, the project is following two parallel development lines:

Tomoyo Linux 1.x, original version

- uses purposely created non-standard hooks
- fully featured MAC
- released as a patch for Linux kernel – Since this version 1.x does not depend on LSM, it can be used with Linux kernel 2.6 (starting from version 2.6.11) as well as 2.4.
- latest version: 1.7.1

Tomoyo Linux 2.x, mainline version

- uses standard LSM hooks
- fewer features
- integral part of Linux kernel version 2.6.30
- latest version: 2.5.0 included in Linux kernel 3.2

Akari (stylised as AKARI), Tomoyo 1.x fork

- uses standard LSM hooks
- fewer features than Tomoyo 1.x, but more than Tomoyo 2.x
- released as LKM (Loadable Kernel Module), so no recompilation of the kernel is necessary

== Naming ==
The name 'TOMOYO' is, officially speaking, a backronym for "Task Oriented Management Obviates Your Onus". According to one of the developers Tetsuo Handa, it's also a reference to the character Tomoyo Daidouji from Cardcaptor Sakura.
