= LinuxWorld =

LinuxWorld has various meanings:

- LinuxWorld Conference and Expo - a series of Linux conferences worldwide that became OpenSource World in 2009
- LinuxWorld.com - a web publication produced by Network World, an International Data Group company
