= GLBasic =

Commercial BASIC programming language

- GLBasic 8
- Developer: Dream Design Entertainment Software
- Stable release: 15.004 / August 4, 2017; 9 years ago
- Preview release: 15.238
- Operating system: Windows
- Platform: Windows, Intel/PowerPC Mac, Linux (and Xbox Linux), OS-X, Pocket PC, GP32, GP2X/GP2X Wiz, iPhone, iPad, Palm Pre/Pixi, HP WebOS devices (HP TouchPad, Pre2/3, Veer), Open Pandora, Palm Pre 2/Tablet, Android
- Type: Compiler
- License: 2D Free version for Windows, Mac and Linux (can also be used to compile time-limited versions for other supported platforms), Commercial version, Free School Version
- Website: www.glbasic.com

GLBasic is a commercial BASIC programming language that can compile to various platforms including Windows, Linux, Mac OS X, and some handheld devices. The language is designed to be simple and intuitive.

== Overview ==
GLBasic started as an interpreted language with 2D commands (GL stands for Graphics Language). It now uses the GCC compiler for many different platforms to achieve fast, native code results. The GLBasic precompiler "GPC" converts the simple BASIC language into C++ code and compiles it later. Thus, the user can extend GLBasic using the INLINE command to mix C/C++ code directly with GLBasic source code. Due to this, GLBasic can easily access third-party dynamic libraries on all platforms. The GLBasic SDK comes with an IDE, debugger, and a graphics engine built on OpenGL (or OpenGL ES) for the platforms Windows, Linux, Mac OS X, iOS, and WebOS. For handheld devices (Windows Mobile, GP2X, and GP2X Wiz), GLBasic uses its own close-to-hardware routines for fast graphics.

To compile for the iPhone or iPad, you will need an iMac (on which to compile the generated code - to comply with Apple's requirements) and the latest version of Xcode, which is a free download from the Apple website.

To be able to actually run the program on an iPhone or iPad (GLBasic programs will not work on the emulator), you need to be a member of the iPhone Apple Developer Connection.

Since the release of the 8.054 beta, it became possible to compile for the Open Pandora machine as well. However, with the lack of Windows programming tools half of the compiling process is performed on Windows, and the other half on the actual machine. Since version 10, the IDE directly builds packages on Windows for the Pandora.

Version 8.230 and above can compile for the Web-OS devices like the Palm Pre without additional hardware or developer program membership requirements. Support for the HP TouchPad was added in September 2011 via a web-update.

Version 10.057 added support to build application packages running on Android devices.

GLBasic comes with numerous examples.

== Online publication ==
Apps created with GLBasic can be uploaded to the Apple App Store, Google Play, and HP's App Catalog; all of which require a developer account. Costs to the developer and pre-publication review level depend on the publisher used.

For Apple iOS the iOS Developer Program costs US$99 per year. All apps published on the app store are required to undergo a two-week, review-and-approval process prior to publication.

For Android there is a one-time fee of US$25. Apps published via Google Play Store are not subject to an approval process and are immediately available to the public.

Publishing via HP's App Catalog requires a free account. Apps placed for sale through HP's App Catalog undergo a five-day review process before publication.

A wrapper for the Intel AppUp Centre SDK is also available for GLBasic.

== Features ==
GLBasic has the following features:

=== General ===
- Programs are written in BASIC.
- String and numbers are automatically converted between types.
- Arrays can be a fixed size or dynamic.
- Sound, graphics and data can be compressed into a single file.
- Users can define their own types. Types within type and dynamic arrays are allowed.
- C code can be included by putting appropriate code between a starting and ending command, or can be included during compilation. In addition, for Windows, functions within DLLs can be called.
- A few features are only available in PC format.
- Programs for the iOS can use OpenFeint.

=== 3D features ===
- The 3D engine is simple to use and maintains fast processing of objects
- Objects can be animated
- Works with most of the common 3D formats
- Objects can have shadows
- An Entity System is available as a free open source library package

=== 2D features ===
- Sprites can be rotated and scaled and take account of blending and tinting values.
- Lines, filled rectangles, and other shapes can be drawn.

=== Network features ===
- TCP/IP and UDP/IP sockets are available, as well as a higher-level library built atop the IP-sockets.

=== Compiler ===
- The compiler is cross-platform. You do need an Intel Mac to compile the generated iPhone code though, as per Apple's legal requirements.

=== IDE ===
- The editor is Windows only, but can run at a decent speed in most virtual machines. With Wine though, you can only compile for windows. Crossover/Mac support is given since version 10.
- A third-party editor for the Mac is being worked on.

== GUI system ==
GLBasic comes with the source code to DDgui, an easy-to-use GUI system, allowing all supported platforms to have the same look and feel across all platforms.

For Windows, Linux and Mac GLBasic has ported a Tcl/Tk wrapper that offers a native OS look.

== Versions ==
GLBasic has gone through the following revisions:

- Version 1.2 - The first version of GLBasic (also known as The DiNGS Game Basic sequel) (2000)
- Version 2.4 - This introduced PocketPC support
- Version 3.0 - (Codename: Behemoth) added TYPEs
- Version 4.0 - Introduced the ability to interface with Window's DLLs and introduced compiling for the Xbox (if Linux is installed on it). It should also run on standard Linux, although there is no hardware acceleration, so programs run much slower. (2007)
- Version 5.0 - Introduced compiling for the Apple Mac as a Universal application
- Version 6.0 - Introduced integers into GLBasic for the first time. Previously variables could either be floating-point or strings (December 2008)
- Version 7.0 - Introduced the ability to compile for Apple iPhone and iPod Touch devices. (August 2009)
- Version 8.2 - Now free for non-commercial Projects, supports Open Pandora platform, iPhone/iPad support (August 2010)
- Version 9.0 - Introduced the ability to compile for Palm WebOS (Palm Pre, Palm Pixi). (March 2011)
- Version 10.057 - Introduced the ability to compile for Android
- Version 10.109 - Added support for WebOS pads like the HP TouchPad
- Version 11.0 - Added HTML5 support
- Version 12 - Improved HTML5 port, native GUI library (January 2014)
- Version 14* - Other platforms now installed as plugins, PRESCALER, improved debugging (August 2015) *skipped v13
- Version 14 - Update: introduces support for IPv6 in network commands, libPNG updated (October 2016)
- Version 15 - "Unicorn", Improved debugging options, adds True Type Fonts (November 2017)
- Version 16 - Available through Steam, renewed C++ compiler, Windows x64 support (March 2019)

== Sample code ==
Hello World

// this is a comment
// Print "Hello World" to the screen position 0,0 (top, left)
PRINT "Hello World", 0,0
// swap backbuffer and visible screen, prepare backbuffer for next rendering
SHOWSCREEN
// wait for a key to be pressed
KEYWAIT

== Limited object-oriented scope ==
With Version 8, GLBasic added basic object-oriented commands to the TYPE command. This allows structures to access itself (using the 'self' command) and to have functions within TYPEs

== Simple OOP test ==
 TYPE Tvec
  x;y;z
  FUNCTION null:
   self.x = 0; self.y=0;
  ENDFUNCTION

  FUNCTION add: v AS Tvec
   INC self.x, v.x
   INC self.y, v.y
   INC self.z, v.z
  END FUNCTION
 END TYPE

 LOCAL vec AS Tvec, vec2 AS Tvec

 vec.null()
 vec.x=50
 vec2.x = 100
 vec.add(vec2)

Version 8 can encrypt and decrypt strings using 128-bit Blowfish.

== See also ==
- SdlBasic, an interpreted BASIC for GP2X
- Basic4GL
- Fenix Project, an interpreted language intended to be easier to learn than C++
- DarkBASIC Professional, a Windows-only BASIC compiler
