= Linux Intrusion Detection System =

Linux security patch

In computer security, the Linux Intrusion Detection System (LIDS) was a patch to the Linux kernel and associated administrative tools that enhanced the kernel's security by implementing mandatory access control (MAC). When LIDS was in effect all system network administration operations, chosen file access, any capability use, raw device, memory, and I/O access could be made impossible, even for root. One could define which programs can access specific files. It used and extended the system capabilities bounding set to control the whole system and added some network and filesystem security features to the kernel to enhance the security. One could finely tune the security protections online, hide sensitive processes, receive security alerts through the network, and more. LIDS supported Linux kernel 2.6, 2.4. LIDS was released under the terms of the GNU General Public License (GPL).

== Current status ==
As of 2013, the Project is not active. The last updates on the homepage and in the associated forum were from 2012. The webpage is up again at https://lids.org

== Awards ==
- Top 75 security tools in 2003
- Top 50 Security tools in 2000
- Best of Linux for October 9, 2000

== History ==
- 1999

Project founded Huagang Xie starts LIDS, with early support from the Software Research Center at the Institute of Computing Technology, and hosting from Turbolinux China.

- 2000

Recognition Named "Best of Linux" by Linux.DaveCentral.com; later voted into insecure.org's top security tools list by the Nmap community.

- 2001 – 2002

Two stable branches Philippe Biondi co-maintains releases across kernel 2.2 (0.x) and 2.4 (1.1.x) while development races ahead on 2.5.

- 2002

LIDS joins the LSM tree LIDS 2.0 is ported to the Linux Security Modules framework and included in the LSM 2.5 tree — LIDS can now be built as a kernel module.

- 2004 – 2005

TDE sandboxing & worldwide coverage Trusted Domain Enforcement lands (paper by Yusuf Wilajati Purna). Articles appear on Linux.com, in c't (Netherlands), Network World Japan, and in German and Japanese books.

- 2005 – 2009

The 2.6 era LIDS 2.2.x tracks the fast-moving 2.6 kernel from 2.6.11 through 2.6.32, with the LIDS-JP community (Omo Kazuki) providing packages and documentation from lids.jp.

- 2010 – 2013

Final years The site moves hosts, the forum moves to lids.jp, and development winds down as LSM-based systems like SELinux and AppArmor become standard in mainline distributions.

== See also ==
- AppArmor
- Security-Enhanced Linux (SELinux)
