= Linux Security Modules =

Framework to support computer security models

Linux Security Modules (LSM) is a framework allowing the Linux kernel to support, without bias, a variety of computer security models. LSM is licensed under the terms of the GNU General Public License and is a standard part of the Linux kernel since Linux 2.6. As of 2025, AppArmor, LoadPin, SELinux, Smack, TOMOYO, Yama, SafeSetID, Integrity Policy Enforcement (IPE), and Landlock are the currently approved security modules in the official kernel.

== Design ==
LSM was designed in order to answer all the requirements for successfully implementing a mandatory access control module, while imposing the fewest possible changes to the Linux kernel. LSM avoids the approach of system call interposition used by Systrace because it doesn't scale to multiprocessor kernels and is subject to TOCTTOU (race) attacks. Instead, LSM inserts "hooks" (upcalls to the module) at every point in the kernel where a user-level system-call is about to result with an access to an important internal kernel-object like inodes and process control blocks.

LSM is narrowly scoped to solve the problem of access control, while not imposing a large and complex change-patch on the mainstream kernel. It isn't intended to be a general "hook" or "upcall" mechanism, nor does it support operating system-level virtualization.

LSM's access-control goal is very closely related to the problem of system auditing, but is subtly different. Auditing requires that every attempt at access be recorded. LSM cannot deliver this, because it would require a great many more hooks, in order to detect cases where the kernel "short circuits" failing system-calls and returns an error code before getting near significant objects.

The LSM design is described in the paper "Linux Security Modules: General Security Support for the Linux Kernel" presented at USENIX Security Symposium 2002. At the same conference was the paper "Using CQUAL for Static Analysis of Authorization Hook Placement" which studied automatic static analysis of the kernel code to verify that all of the necessary hooks have actually been inserted into the Linux kernel.

== Adoption ==
- AppArmor
- Integrity Policy Enforcement (IPE)
- Landlock
- LoadPin
- SafeSetID
- SELinux
- Smack
- TOMOYO
- Yama

== History ==
At the 2001 Linux Kernel Summit, the NSA proposed that SELinux be included in Linux 2.5. Linus Torvalds rejected SELinux at that time, because he observed that there are many different security projects in development, and since they all differ, the security community has not yet formed consensus on the ultimate security model. Instead, Linus charged the security community to "make it a module".

In response, Crispin Cowan proposed LSM: an interface for the Linux kernel that provides sufficient "hooks" (upcalls) from within the Linux kernel to a loadable module so as to allow the module to enforce mandatory access controls. Development of LSM over the next two years was conducted by the LSM community, including substantial contributions from the Immunix Corporation, the NSA, McAfee, IBM, Silicon Graphics, and many independent contributors. LSM was ultimately accepted into the Linux kernel mainstream and was included as a standard part of Linux 2.6 in December 2003.

In 2006, some kernel developers observed that SELinux was the only widely used LSM module included in the mainstream Linux kernel source tree. If there is to be only one widely used LSM module, it was reasoned, then the indirection of LSM is unnecessary, and LSM should be removed and replaced with SELinux itself. However, there are other LSM modules maintained outside of the mainstream kernel tree (AppArmor, Linux Intrusion Detection System, FireFlier, CIPSO, Multi ADM, etc.), so this argument led to two results: 1. that developers of these modules started putting effort into upstreaming their respective modules, and 2. at the 2006 Linux Kernel Summit, Linus once again asserted that LSM would stay because he does not want to arbitrate which is the best security model.

LSM is likely to remain since additional security modules Smack (version 2.6.25), TOMOYO Linux (version 2.6.30, June 2009) and AppArmor (version 2.6.36) were accepted in the mainline kernel.
