= Don Marti =

American activist

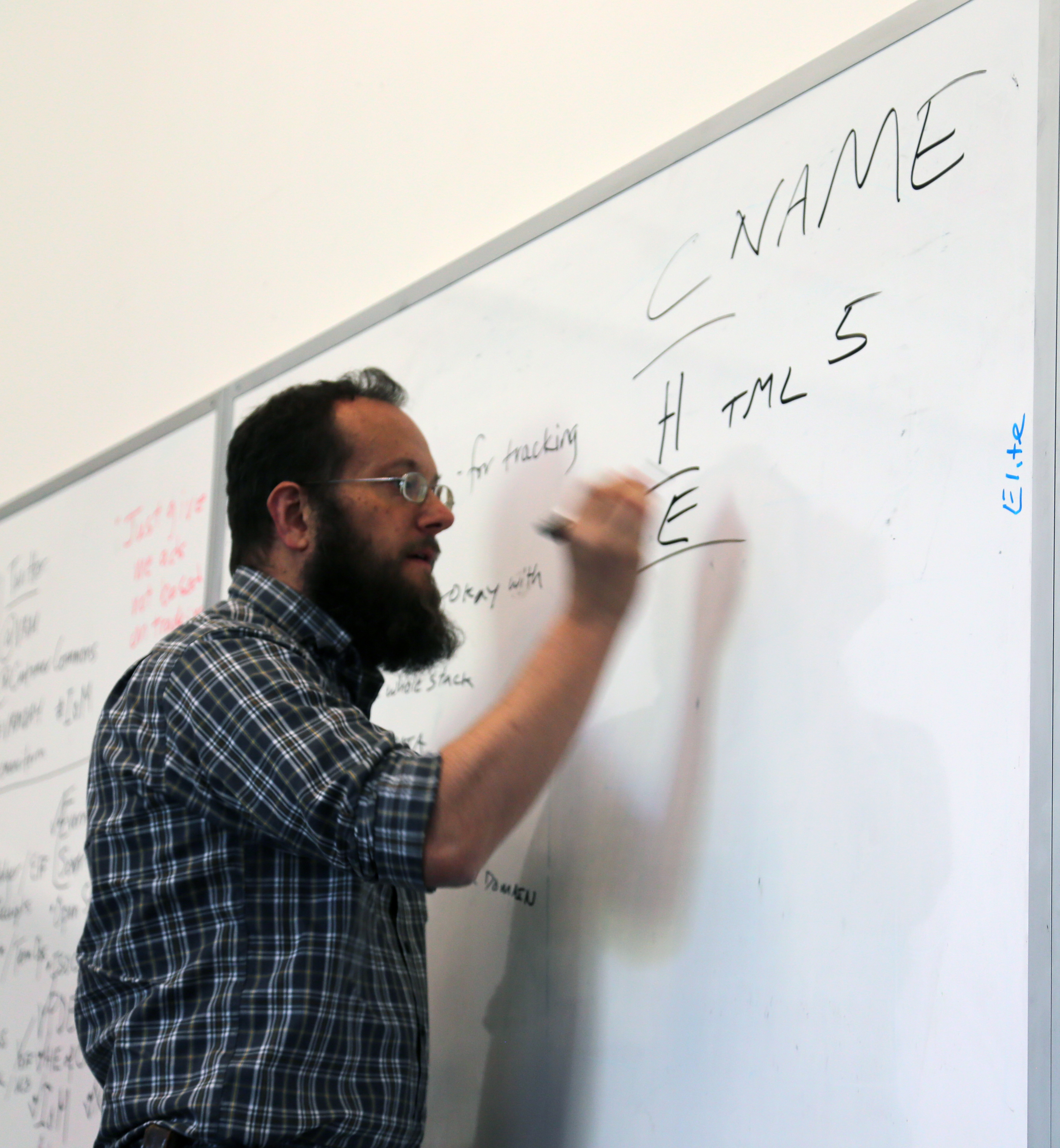
- Don Marti
- Education: M.S., Science and Environmental Reporting
- Alma mater: New York University
- Occupations: Writer, editor, open-source software advocate
- Known for: FreedomHEC; open-source and Linux journalism; digital privacy research

Don Marti is a writer and advocate for free and open source software, writing for LinuxWorld and Linux Today.

Marti was educated at New York University, receiving a master's degree in science and environmental reporting.

He co-founded a Linux International member company, Electric Lichen L.L.C., an open-source Internet development firm. From 2000 to 2004, Marti was the vice-president and President of the Silicon Valley Linux Users Group.

Marti also served as Technical Editor for the Linux Journal, the leading Linux publication at the time, from 2000 to 2002. He also served LinuxWorld as Editor-in-Chief from 2002 to 2005.

Marti was the Conference Chair for the LinuxWorld Conference and Expo from 2005 to 2009 (in 2009, its last year, it was renamed to OpenSource World). He was the initiator of the FreedomHEC "unconference", first organized in 2006, which focused on making computer hardware more interoperate with Linux.

In February 2021, Marti co-authored a study highlighting the “significant difficulty” consumers were facing in the opt-out process required by the California Consumer Privacy Act. In response, data brokers including Acxiom, BrandWatch, LiveRamp and Oracle updated their interfaces to make them easier to navigate.

Marti was a participation strategist at the Mozilla Corporation until 2020, when he joined CafeMedia as VP Ecosystem Innovation.
