= FLASK =

Operating system security architecture

The Flux Advanced Security Kernel (FLASK) is an operating system security architecture that provides flexible support for security policies. It is a joint venture between the National Security Agency, the University of Utah, and the Secure Computing Corporation project designed to provide a framework for a more secure operating system. Development and implementation started with the Mach microkernel, and has since shifted its focus to the Linux operating system. FLASK is a core framework in security-focused operating systems such as NSA's Security-Enhanced Linux (SELinux), OpenSolaris FMAC and TrustedBSD. This means that SELinux can be thought of as an implementation of FLASK.
