= Audiere =

- Developer(s): Chad Austin, Matthew Campbell
- Initial release: August 6, 2001; 24 years ago
- Final release: 1.9.4 / February 14, 2006; 19 years ago
- Platform: Unix-like, Microsoft Windows
- Type: Application programming interface (API)
- License: LGPL
- Website: audiere.sourceforge.net

Audiere is a high-level audio API. It can play Ogg Vorbis, MP3, FLAC, uncompressed WAV, AIFF, MOD, S3M, XM, and IT files. For audio output, Audiere supports DirectSound or WinMM in Windows, OSS on Linux and Cygwin, and SGI AL on IRIX.

Audiere is open-source and licensed under the LGPL. This means that you may freely use Audiere in commercial products, as long as you do not modify the source code. If you do modify Audiere and release a product that uses your modifications, you must release your changes to the code under the LGPL as well.

Audiere is portable. It is tested on Windows, Linux-i386, Cygwin, and IRIX with at least three major compilers. Most of Audiere is endian-independent, so expect it to work with few modifications on other architectures.

Audiere does not support three-dimensional positional audio.
