= Linux Mark Institute =

Organization which administers the "Linux" trademark

LMI Oregon, LLC
- Type: Private
- Headquarters: Beaverton, Oregon, US
- Website: www.linuxfoundation.org/legal/the-linux-mark

The Linux Mark Institute (LMI, fully "LMI Oregon, LLC") is an organization which administers the "Linux" trademark on behalf of Linus Torvalds for computer software which includes the Linux kernel, computer hardware utilizing Linux-based software, and for services associated with the implementation and documentation of Linux-based products.

== Trademark ==
The Linux trademark is owned by Linus Torvalds in the U.S., Germany, the E.U., and Japan for "Computer operating system software to facilitate computer use and operation". The assignment of the trademark to Torvalds occurred after a lawsuit against attorney William R. Della Croce Jr., of Boston, who had registered the trademark in the US in September 1995 and began in 1996 to send letters to various Linux distributors, demanding ten percent of royalties from sales of Linux products. A petition against Della Croce's practices was started, and in early 1997, WorkGroup Solutions, Yggdrasil, Linux Journal, Linux International, and Torvalds appealed the original trademark assignment as "fraudulent and obtained under false pretenses". By November, the case was settled and Torvalds owned the trademark.

== History ==
LMI originally charged a nominal sublicensing fee for use of the Linux name as part of trademarks, but later changed this in favor of offering a free, perpetual worldwide sublicense.

LMI was headquartered in Monterey, California until at least 2005. Since at least 2009 it was headquartered in Beaverton, Oregon.
