= FreedomHEC =

FreedomHEC (a play on WinHEC) was an "unconference" for computer hardware engineers and device driver developers that ran from 2006 to 2012. It focused on making computer hardware interoperate with free software and open source operating systems, especially Linux.

The idea of FreedomHEC “unconference” was first proposed by writer Don Marti on a Linux-related mailing list.

The first FreedomHEC conference was held May 26–27, 2006, in Seattle and was attended by around 30 people. The second was held May 18–19, 2007 in Los Angeles. These two events were scheduled immediately after WinHEC—and in the same city—to make it easier for developers to attend both of them.

The third FreedomHEC was held November 20–21, 2008, in Taipei, Taiwan. The fourth was held June 10–11, 2009, in Taipei.

The fourth and last FreedomHEC conference was held on June 12–13, 2012, again in Taipei.
