= LinuxWorld Conference and Expo =

Education Events

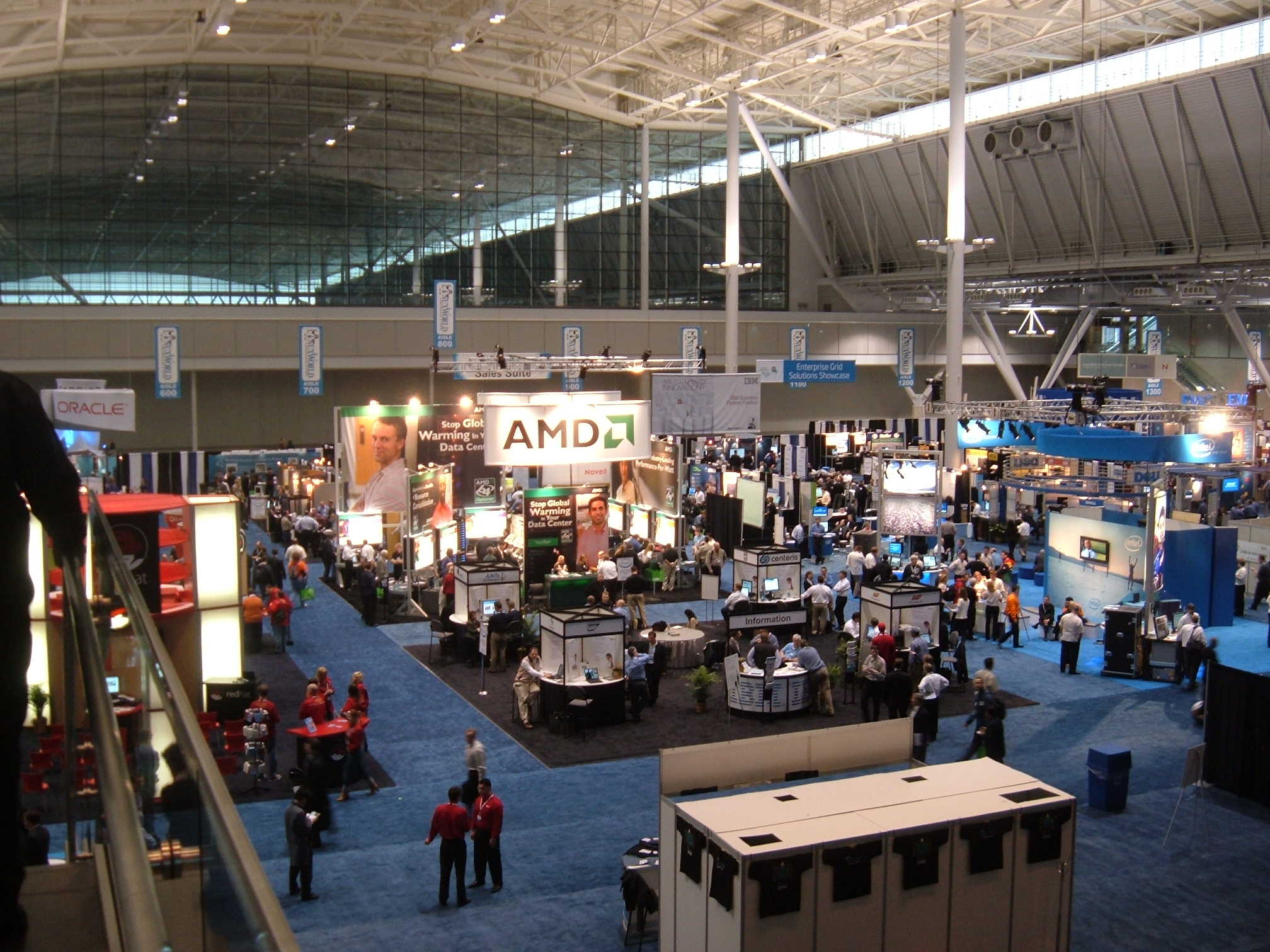
The 2006 LinuxWorld trade show at the Boston Convention and Exposition Center.

LinuxWorld Conference and Expo (renamed to OpenSource World in its final year) was a conference and trade show that focused on open source and Linux solutions in the information technology sector. It ran from 1998 to 2009, in venues around the world.

The show was owned and managed by IDG World Expo, a business unit of International Data Group (IDG). Keynote speakers included Linux creator Linus Torvalds, One Laptop Per Child founder Nicholas Negroponte, and Creative Commons founder Lawrence Lessig. Another IDG business unit, Network World, operated the LinuxWorld.com web site, which often carried audio, video, and presentation materials from the show, as well as interviews with the show's speakers.

This event should not be confused with the "Open Source World Conference", an annual Spanish-language event that ran from 2004 to 2012.

== History ==
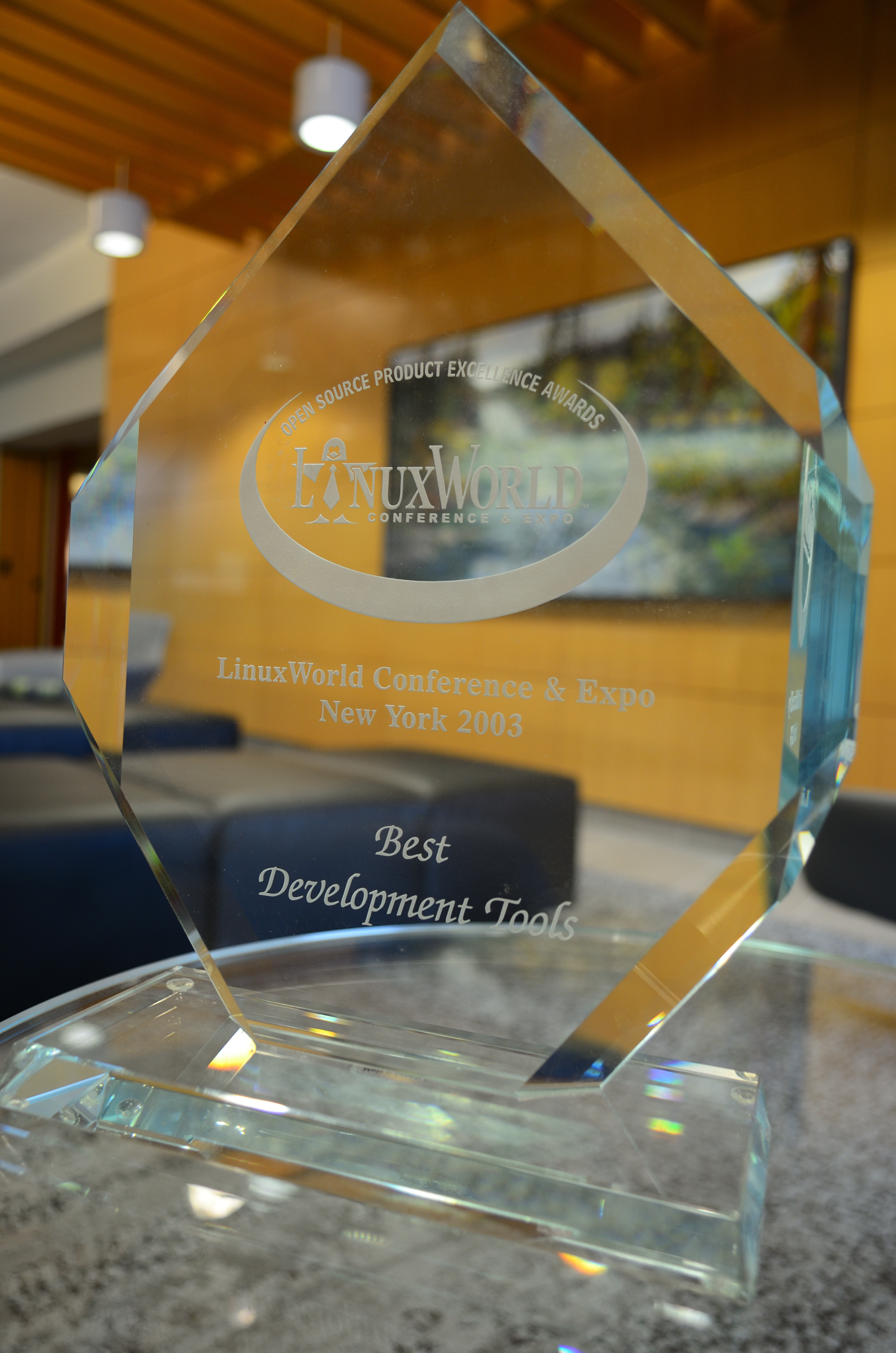
LinuxWorld Conference & Expo award won by IBM

The first LinuxWorld Conference and Expo occurred in 1998 at the San Jose Convention Center. The keynote speaker was Linus Torvalds. The event featured a debate with Torvalds, Richard Stallman and Larry Wall. At the conference an agreement was made by Patrick Op de Beeck and Mark Shuttleworth concerning cooperation between KDE and Gnome for improving each other's work.

The 2001 documentary film Revolution OS includes footage from the 1999 LinuxWorld event in New York City.

Writer and free software advocate Don Marti ran LinuxWorld from 2005 until its end in 2009.

LinuxWorld Open Solutions Summits took place in Italy, Spain, Sweden, and New York City.

LinuxWorld Conference and Expo took place in the following locations, among others:

- Belgium
- Brazil
- Canada
- Beijing, China
- Guangzhou, China
- Shanghai, China
- Germany
- Japan
- Korea
- Malaysia
- Mexico
- Netherlands
- Singapore
- South Africa
- United Kingdom (in London)
- San Francisco, United States
- Boston, United States

In 2009, the conference was renamed to "OpenSource World". It was held at the Moscone Center in San Francisco. This was the last known LinuxWorld or OpenSource World event.

== See also ==
- List of free-software events
