= Immunix =

- Developer: Immunix, Inc.
- OS family: Linux (Unix-like)
- Latest release: 7.3 / November 27, 2003; 22 years ago
- Kernel type: Monolithic kernel (Linux)
- Official website: immunix.com at the Wayback Machine (archived 2004-02-25)

Immunix is a discontinued commercial operating system that provided host-based application security. The last release of Immunix's Linux distribution was version 7.3 on November 27, 2003. Immunix, Inc. was the creator of AppArmor, an application security system.

On May 10, 2005, Novell acquired Immunix, Inc., a long-time partner of Novell. AppArmor was one of Novell's primary interests, and as a result, it was adopted by the company and renamed Novell AppArmor powered by Immunix. In September 2007, Novell laid off the AppArmor team.

== See also ==
- Novell
- Security-focused operating system
