= SdlBasic =

Multiplatform interpreter for BASIC

SdlBasic is a multiplatform interpreter for BASIC, using the SDL libraries. Its interpreter core is based on wxBasic. The interpreter can be very useful for people who are familiar with ANSI-BASIC interpreters and are curious or needing SDL library features on their coding development. Using the IDE it is possible to create an executable. This implementation helped inspire the RCBasic development environment released under the zlib license, with an attempt also made at producing an AllegroBASIC for the similar Allegro library. Gambas also provides a built-in SDL component allowing use of BASIC with the library.

== History ==
SdlBasic development started at December 2002, when its author, Vroby (Roberto Viola), got an idea on using SDL libraries on wxBasic core, instead of wxWidgets libraries.

There were major releases in 2004, 2005, 2007 and 2012. Prior to 2005 any text editor was used to write program code. In 2005 an IDE was added. In 2012 the package was split into the IDE and the interpreter, although the IDE could be used to run code. Main download site is SourceForge.

The support site (online documentation and forum) has moved and has changed maintainer. Now to be found at the link added below, on altervista.org. The original author still contributes to the forum.

== PSP Port ==
On May 22, 2008, SDLBasic was ported to the Sony PlayStation Portable. It allows you to play games and use applications coded in SDLBasic. Recently someone on the qj forums released an update version 0.7 which included video output on the slim.

== Licence ==
SdlBasic is open source and is freely available under the terms of the GNU General Public Licence.

== Code example ==
Function swap( a, b )
    tmp = a
    a = b
    b = tmp
End Function
v1=10
v2=20
print v1, v2
swap( v1, v2 )
print v1, v2
