= DARSIMCO =

1950s programming language for mathematical operations

- Paradigms: procedural
- Designed by: John G. Kemeny
- Developer: Dartmouth College
- First appeared: 1956; 69 years ago
- Implementation language: Assembly
- Platform: IBM 704

Influenced
- DOPE, Dartmouth BASIC

DARSIMCO, short for Dartmouth Simplified Code, was a simple programming language written by John Kemeny in 1956 that expanded simple mathematical operations into IBM 704 assembly language (Share Assembly Language, SAL). It was an attempt to simplify basic mathematical processing, a common theme in the 1950s, but found little use before the arrival of FORTRAN at MIT the next year.

== Description ==
This language was essentially a set of macros that expanded out user source code into a series of assembly language instructions, which were then compiled using the existing SAL assembler, Symbolic Assembly Program. For instance, the formula A + B = C would add the values in memory locations A and B and put the result in C. To do this, the DARSIMCO compiler would write out the following three instructions:

 LDA A
 FAD B
 STO C

The language included similar expansions for subtraction, multiplication, division, and simple looping.

The language was implemented on the IBM 704 at MIT's New England Regional Computer Center. Programmed using punch cards, the system had a two-week turnaround because Kemeny had to take the cards in via train from Dartmouth.

== See also ==
- Autocode, a similar concept for mathematical programming
