= Kemeny's constant =

In probability theory, Kemeny’s constant is the expected number of time steps required for a Markov chain to transition from a starting state i to a random destination state sampled from the Markov chain's stationary distribution. Surprisingly, this quantity does not depend on which starting state i is chosen. It is in that sense a constant, although it is different for different Markov chains. When first published by John Kemeny in 1960 a prize was offered for an intuitive explanation as to why the quantity was constant.

Beyond its theoretical importance, Kemeny’s constant is also applied in practice to evaluate the efficiency of robotic surveillance strategies. More precisely, Kemeny's constant measures how quickly a robot can navigate its environment using Markov chain-based methods.

== Definition ==
For a finite ergodic Markov chain with transition matrix P and invariant distribution π, write m_{ij} for the mean first passage time from state i to state j (denoting the mean recurrence time for the case i = j). Then

$$K = \sum_{j} \pi_j m_{ij}$$

is a constant and not dependent on i.

== Prize ==
Kemeny wrote, (for i the starting state of the Markov chain) “A prize is offered for the first person to give an intuitively plausible reason for the above sum to be independent of i.” Grinstead and Snell offer an explanation by Peter Doyle as an exercise, with solution “he got it!”

In the course of a walk with Snell along Minnehaha Avenue in Minneapolis in the fall of 1983, Peter Doyle suggested the following explanation for the constancy of Kemeny's constant. Choose a target state according to the fixed vector w. Start from state i and wait until the time T that the target state occurs for the first time. Let K_{i} be the expected value of T. Observe that

$$K_i+w_i \cdot 1/w_i = \sum_j P_{ij}K_j + 1$$

and hence

$$K_i = \sum_j P_{ij}K_j.$$

By the maximum principle, K_{i} is a constant. Should Peter have been given the prize?
