= Nándor Balázs =

Hungarian-American physicist (1926–2003)

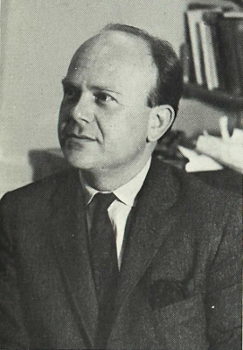
- Nándor Balázs, circa 1966
- Born: Nándor László Balázs; July 7, 1926; Budapest, Hungary
- Died: August 16, 2003 (aged 77); Setauket, New York, U.S.
- Education: University of Budapest; University of Amsterdam
- Scientific career
- Fields: Theoretical physics
- Workplaces: Enrico Fermi Institute of the University of Chicago; Princeton University; Stony Brook University

Nándor Balázs (Hungarian: Balázs Nándor László; July 7, 1926 – August 16, 2003) was a Hungarian-American physicist, and an external member of the Hungarian Academy of Sciences.

== Early life ==
Balázs attended Rácz private primary school where he was a classmate of Janos Kemeny. Balázs earned a master's degree at the University of Budapest (1948). Balázs left communist Hungary in 1949. He completed a PhD at the University of Amsterdam (1951).

== Career ==
Balázs spent 1951 and 1952 as assistant to Schroedinger at the Dublin Institute for Advanced Studies, autumn 1952 through summer 1953 as assistant to Albert Einstein at the Institute for Advanced Study. He was associate professor of physics at the University of Alabama from 1953–56. From 1956 to 1959, he was research associate at the Enrico Fermi Institute at the University of Chicago, and became a research staff member at the Plasma Physics Laboratory at Princeton University from 1959 to 1961. In 1961 he went to Stony Brook University.

Balázs had close friendships and working collaborations with Erwin Schroedinger, Paul Dirac (whose wife Margit Wigner was Hungarian), Subrahmanyan Chandrasekhar, Eugene Wigner, and other prominent physicists.

Balázs maintained contacts in Hungary and occasionally brought Hungarian physicists to the US. In his collaborations with people in Budapest, such as Béla Lukács and József Zimányi, he dealt with relativistic heavy-ion collisions and thus provided a connection between Stony Brook (a home of RHIC theory) and Hungary.

== Works ==
- Effect of a gravitational field, due to a rotating body, on the plane of polarization of an electromagnetic wave. Phys. Rev. 110, 236–239 (1958)
- EINSTEIN: Theory of Relativity. Gillispie (ed.) Dictionary of Scientific Biography, vol. IV, 319-332 (1971)
