= Thomas E. Kurtz =

American computer scientist and educator (1928–2024)

- Kurtz, c. 1970s
- Born: Thomas Eugene Kurtz; February 22, 1928; Oak Park, Illinois, U.S.
- Died: November 12, 2024 (aged 96); Lebanon, New Hampshire, U.S.
- Education: Knox College (BA); Princeton University (PhD)
- Occupations: Computer scientist; mathematician; statistician
- Known for: BASIC; Dartmouth Time-Sharing System
- Spouses: Patricia Barr (m. 1953; div. 1973) Agnes Seelye Bixler (m. 1974)
- Children: 3
- Awards: 1974 AFIPS Pioneer Award; 1991 IEEE Computer Science Pioneer Award

Thomas Eugene Kurtz (February 22, 1928 – November 12, 2024) was an American computer scientist and educator. A Dartmouth professor of mathematics, he and colleague John G. Kemeny are best known for co-developing the BASIC programming language and the Dartmouth Time-Sharing System in 1963 and 1964. These innovations made computing more accessible by simplifying programming for non-experts and allowing multiple users to share a single computer, transforming how computers were used in education and research.

For his role in creating BASIC, the IEEE honored Kurtz in 1991 with the Computer Pioneer Award, and in 1994, he was inducted as a fellow of the Association for Computing Machinery.

== Early life and education ==
Thomas Kurtz was born on February 22, 1928, in Oak Park, Illinois, United States, to Helen Bell Kurtz and Oscar Christ Kurtz. His father, a German-American, worked for the Lions Clubs International headquarters, holding various roles. From an early age, Kurtz developed an interest in science.

Kurtz enrolled at Knox College and developed an interest in mathematics, eventually taking every offered course in the subject. Encouraged by his advisor to pursue a career in statistics, he switched his major to mathematics during his senior year. Kurtz graduated from Knox College in 1950 with a bachelor's degree in mathematics.

His first experience with computing came in 1951 at the Summer Session of the Institute for Numerical Analysis at University of California, Los Angeles. Kurtz went on to acquire his Ph.D. degree from Princeton University in 1956. His thesis was on a problem of multiple comparisons in mathematical statistics, and his advisor was John Tukey. Kurtz's mathematical interests included numerical analysis, statistics, and computer science.

== Career ==
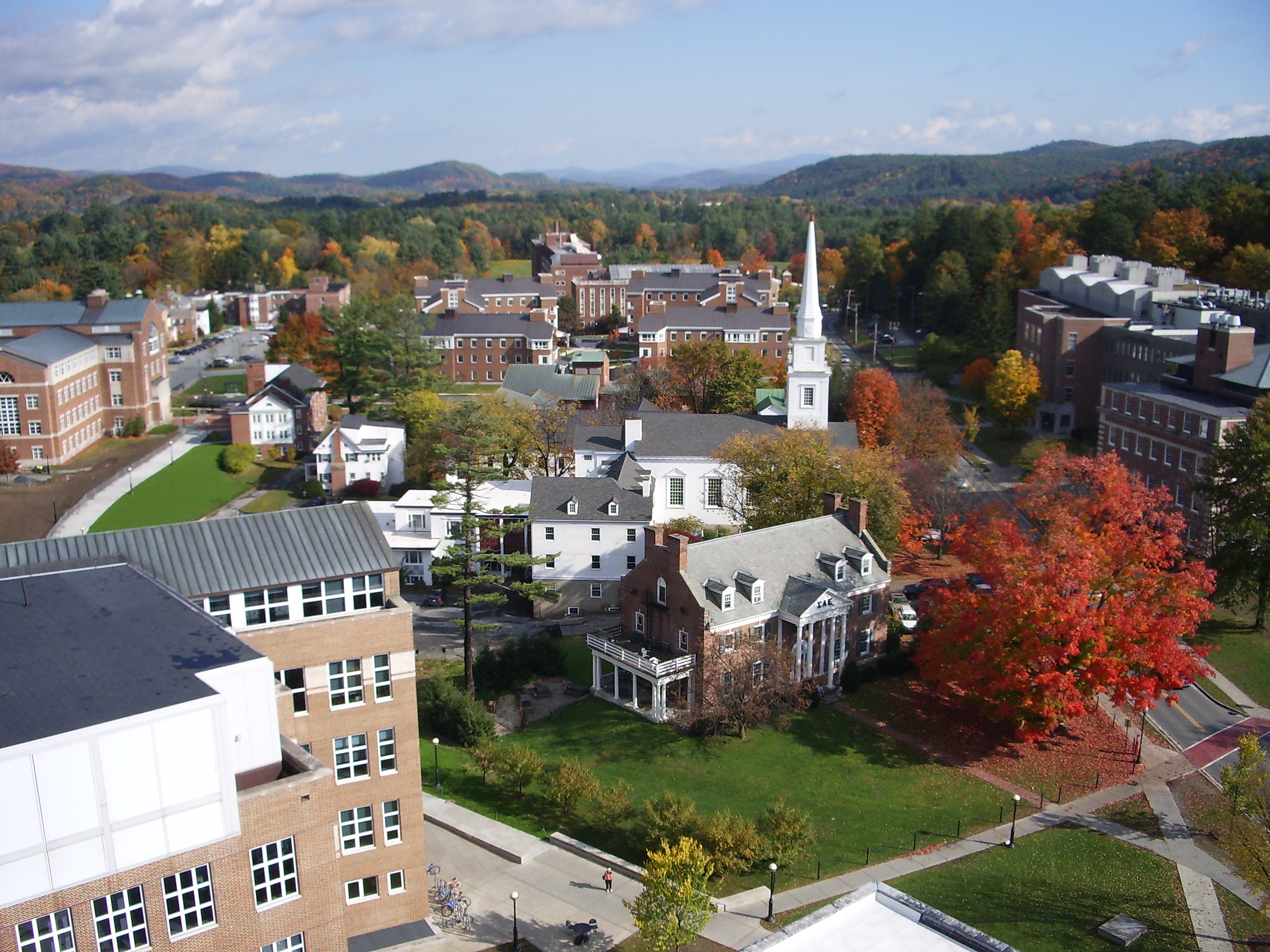
Dartmouth College

In 1956, he was recruited to Dartmouth College by John G. Kemeny and joined the Mathematics Department, where he taught statistics and numerical analysis.

From 1963 to 1964, Kurtz and Kemeny, working with a team of students, led the development of the Dartmouth Time-Sharing System (DTSS) and the BASIC programming language. DTSS allowed multiple users at separate terminals to share the processing power of a single machine, replacing a system of exclusive reservations. Kurtz and Kemeny prioritized simplicity, ensuring that DTSS was accessible to users without technical backgrounds.

From 1966 to 1975, Kurtz served as Director of the Kiewit Computation Center at Dartmouth, and from 1975 to 1978, Director of the Office of Academic Computing. In 1979, he and Stephen J. Garland started a Computer and Information Systems master's program at Dartmouth. After the program ended in 1988, Kurtz returned to teaching, retiring in 1993.

Kurtz also served as Council Chairman and Trustee of EDUCOM, as well as Trustee and Chairman of NERComP, and on the Pierce Panel of the President's Scientific Advisory Committee. Kurtz also served on the steering committees for the CONDUIT project and the CCUC conferences on instructional computing.

In 1974, the American Federation of Information Processing Societies gave an award to Kurtz and Kemeny at the National Computer Conference for their work on BASIC and time-sharing. In 1991, the IEEE Computer Society honored Kurtz with the Computer Pioneer Award, and in 1994, he was inducted as a fellow of the Association for Computing Machinery. In 2023, he was inducted as a fellow of the Computer History Museum, with the award presented by Bill Gates.

== BASIC ==
The approachability of BASIC and time-sharing began what the PC and the internet took to a whole new level.

— Bill Gates, in a 2023 video for Kurtz's induction as a fellow of the Computer History Museum

As part of the Dartmouth Time-Sharing System, Kemeny and Kurtz created the programming language BASIC (Beginner's All-purpose Symbolic Instruction Code). The first BASIC program ran on May 1, 1964, at 4 a.m. At the time, neither Kemeny nor Kurtz saw this as the start of something monumental. Their main hope was that BASIC would help students in understanding and engaging with the computers they were using. While Dartmouth College held the copyright to BASIC, they made it freely accessible to anyone interested in using it, and Kemeny and Kurtz made little money from it. The name for the language originated from Kurtz's wish to have a simple acronym that meant something as well. Kurtz states that: "We wanted a word that was simple but not simple-minded, and BASIC was that one."

The theme that BASIC was for the average computer user was stressed by Kurtz. In an open letter, he reiterated upon past statements that BASIC was invented to give students a simple programming language that was easy to learn, as all the current languages of the time were dedicated to professionals. He went on to say that BASIC was for people who did not want to dedicate their lives to programming.

Although BASIC was widely regarded as a success, some critics considered it to be confusing for longer programs, especially when the "GO TO" statement was used to jump between parts of a program. In addition, because the language was not designed as a structured language, it made it difficult to split programs into separate parts to improve maintainability.

BASIC standards were created in the 1980s for ECMA and ANSI, with their versions being released in 1986 and 1987 respectively. In 1975, when Bill Gates and Paul Allen developed a version of BASIC for the Altair 8800, one of the earliest personal computers, it helped launch the personal computer industry.

Kurtz's work on BASIC was recognized by the IEEE as part of their milestone program, which marks historic places for human innovation from around the world. A commemorative plaque was placed on February 22, 2021.

== True BASIC ==
In 1983, Kemeny, Kurtz, and four former Dartmouth students established True BASIC with the goal of introducing a modern commercial version of BASIC that would address the fragmentation caused by numerous incompatible dialects of the language, which were developed for early personal computers with limited memory and hardware-specific limitations. True BASIC featured structured programming constructs such as a do-loop and else-if and support for multiple operating systems.

Initially backed by $2.3 million in investment, the company struggled with profitability. Disagreements with its marketing partner, Addison-Wesley, led True BASIC to take marketing in-house, but sales still fell short of expectations. The company had annual revenues above $1 million in two years, according to the CEO in 1997, but the rise of integrated BASIC implementations, particularly from Microsoft, and declining demand for standalone programming tools limited its market reach. A 2004 interview noted sales of about 3,000 copies of True BASIC annually, primarily to high school students and hobbyists who had learned the language decades earlier.

== Personal life ==
Kurtz was married to Patricia Barr from 1953 until their divorce in 1973. They had three children: twin sons Daniel Barr and Timothy David in 1954 and daughter Beth Louise in 1957. In 1974, he married Agnes Seelye Bixler, to whom he remained married until his death.

Kurtz died of multiple organ failure caused by sepsis in Lebanon, New Hampshire, on November 12, 2024, at the age of 96.

== See also ==
- New Hampshire Historical Marker No. 261: BASIC: The First User-Friendly Computer Programming Language
