= John G. Kemeny =

Hungarian-American mathematician and computer scientist (1926–1992)

13th President of Dartmouth College
- In office 1970–1981
- Preceded by: John Sloan Dickey
- Succeeded by: David T. McLaughlin

Personal details
- Born: May 31, 1926 Budapest, Kingdom of Hungary
- Died: December 26, 1992 (aged 66) Hanover, New Hampshire, United States
- Education: Princeton University (BA, PhD)
- Awards: Computer Pioneer Award (1985)

John George Kemeny (born Kemény János György; May 31, 1926 – December 26, 1992) was a Hungarian-born American mathematician, computer scientist, and educator best known for co-developing the BASIC programming language in 1964 with Thomas E. Kurtz. Kemeny served as the 13th President of Dartmouth College from 1970 to 1981 and pioneered the use of computers in college education. Kemeny chaired the presidential commission that investigated the Three Mile Island accident in 1979. According to György Marx he was one of "The Martians".

== Early life and education ==
Born in Budapest, Hungary, to a Hungarian-Jewish family, Kemeny attended the Rácz private primary school in Budapest and was a classmate of Nándor Balázs. In 1938 his father left for the United States alone. In 1940, he took the whole Kemeny family to the United States when the adoption of the second anti-Jewish law in Hungary became imminent. His grandfather, however, refused to leave and was killed in the Holocaust, along with an aunt and uncle.

Kemeny's family settled in New York City where he attended George Washington High School. He graduated with the best results in his class three years later. In 1943, Kemeny entered Princeton University where he studied mathematics and philosophy, but he took a year off during his studies to work on the Manhattan Project at Los Alamos National Laboratory, where his boss was Richard Feynman. He also worked there with John von Neumann. Returning to Princeton, Kemeny graduated with an A.B. in mathematics in 1946 after completing a senior thesis, titled "Equivalent logical systems", under the supervision of Alonzo Church. He then remained at Princeton to pursue graduate studies and received a Ph.D. in mathematics in 1949 after completing a doctoral dissertation, titled "Type-theory vs. set-theory", also under the supervision of Alonzo Church.

Kemeny worked as Albert Einstein's mathematical assistant during graduate school. J. Laurie Snell writes the following about Einstein's advice to Kemeny and seeing him drawn to the United World Federalists (UWF) movement:

John was tempted to devote a major part of his time to this program. Einstein told him that he should first make his mark on the world, for then people would listen to him. We have all been rewarded by Kemeny's decision to heed Einstein's advice.

United World Federalists was the movement through which Kemeny met his future wife, then-Smith student Jean Alexander.

== Career ==
Kemeny was appointed to the Dartmouth Mathematics Department as a full professor in 1953, at the age of 27. Two years later he became chairman of the department, and held this post until 1967. Kemeny ventured into curriculum development when he introduced Finite mathematics courses. He teamed with Gerald L. Thompson and J. Laurie Snell to write Introduction to Finite Mathematics (1957) for students of biology and social sciences. The Dartmouth mathematics department professors also wrote Finite Mathematical Structures (1959) and Finite Mathematics with Business Applications (1962). Other colleges and universities followed this lead and several more textbooks in Finite Mathematics were composed elsewhere.

The topic of Markov chains was particularly popular so Kemeny teamed with J. Laurie Snell to publish Finite Markov Chains (1960) to provide an introductory college textbook. Considering the advances using potential theory obtained by G. A. Hunt, they wrote Denumerable Markov Chains in 1966. This textbook, suitable for advanced seminars, was followed by a second edition in 1976 when an additional chapter on random fields by David Griffeath was included.

Kemeny and Kurtz were pioneers in the use of computers for ordinary people. After early experiments with ALGOL 30 and DOPE on the LGP-30, they invented the BASIC programming language in 1964, as well as one of the world's first time-sharing systems, the Dartmouth Time-Sharing System (DTSS). In 1974, the American Federation of Information Processing Societies gave an award to Kemeny and Kurtz at the National Computer Conference for their work on BASIC and time-sharing. Kemeny had a "BASIC" license plate.

Kemeny served as president of Dartmouth from 1970 to 1981; he continued to teach undergraduate courses, and to do research and publish papers during his time as president. He presided over the coeducation of Dartmouth in 1972. He also instituted the "Dartmouth Plan" of year-round operations, thereby allowing more students without more buildings. During his administration, Dartmouth became more proactive in recruiting and retaining minority students and revived its founding commitment to provide education for American Indians. Kemeny made Dartmouth a pioneer in student use of computers, equating computer literacy with reading literacy. In 1982 he returned to teaching full-time.

In 1983, Kemeny and Kurtz co-founded a company called True BASIC, Inc. to market True BASIC, an updated version of the language.

== Death ==
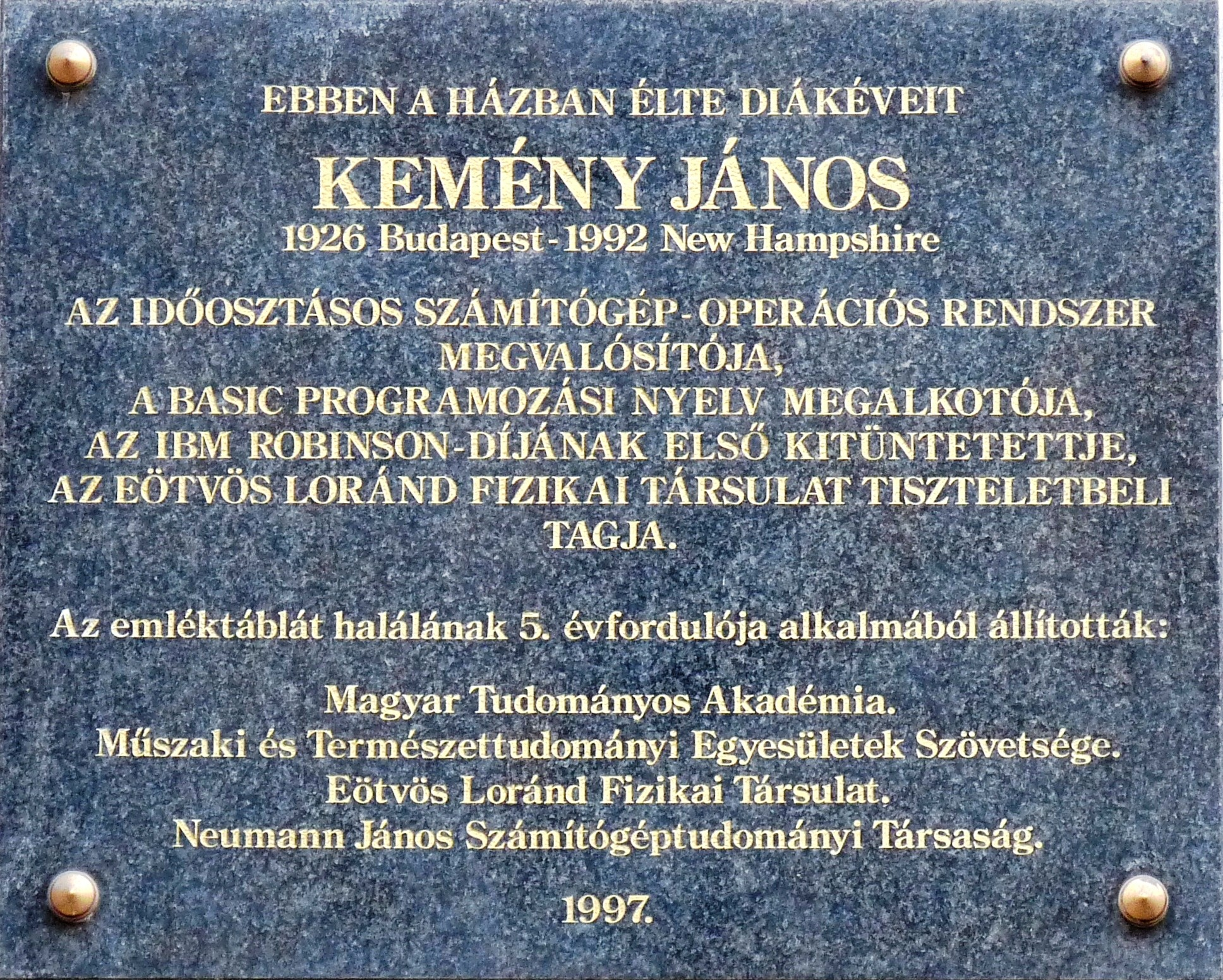
Commemorative plaque to John George Kemeny. It is affixed to the wall of his former domicile.

John Kemeny died at the age of 66, the result of heart failure in Lebanon, New Hampshire on December 26, 1992. He had lived in Etna, near the Dartmouth campus.

== Works ==
- Kemeny, J. G. (1962). Finite Mathematics with Business Applications. Englewood Cliffs, N.J.: Prentice-Hall.

== See also ==
- Kemeny method
- Kemeny's constant (an invariant sum arising in the study of finite Markov chains).
- New Hampshire Historical Marker No. 261: BASIC: The First User-Friendly Computer Programming Language
