= Joint Computer Conference =

Joint Computer Conferences
- Status: Discontinued
- Genre: Computer science and information technology
- Venue: Various locations in the United States
- Inaugurated: 1951
- Most recent: 1987
- Attendance: 15,000 (1967 FJCC)
- Organizer: National Joint Computer Committee (1951–1961) AFIPS (1962–1987)
- Sponsors: ACM; AIEE; IRE

The Joint Computer Conferences were a series of computer conferences in the United States held under various names between 1951 and 1987. The conferences were the venue for presentations and papers representing "cumulative work in the [computer] field."

Originally a semi-annual pair, the Western Joint Computer Conference (WJCC) was held annually in the western United States, and a counterpart, the Eastern Joint Computer Conference (EJCC), was held annually in the eastern US. Both conferences were sponsored by an organization known as the National Joint Computer Committee (NJCC), composed of the Association for Computing Machinery (ACM), the American Institute of Electrical Engineers (AIEE) Committee on Computing Devices, and the Institute of Radio Engineers (IRE) Professional Group on Electronic Computers.

In 1962 the American Federation of Information Processing Societies (AFIPS) took over sponsorship and renamed them Fall Joint Computer Conference (FJCC) and Spring Joint Computer Conference (SJCC).

In 1973 AFIPS merged the two conferences into a single annual National Computer Conference (NCC) which ran until discontinued in 1987.

The 1967 FJCC in Anaheim, California attracted 15,000 attendees. In 1968 in San Francisco, California Douglas Engelbart presented "The Mother of All Demos" presenting such then-new technologies as the computer mouse, video conferencing, teleconferencing, and hypertext.

== Conference dates ==
=== Eastern Joint Computer Conference ===
Year	Location	Dates	Comments
1951	Philadelphia, PA	December 10–12	Presented papers published with the title "Review of Electronic Digital Computers"
1952	New York, NY	December 10–12	"Review of Input and Output Equipment used in Computing Systems"
1953	Washington, DC	December 8–10	Theme: "Information Processing Systems – Reliability and Requirements"
1954	Philadelphia, PA	December 10–12	"The Design and Application of Small Digital Computers" (Note: Small Digital Computers "being defined roughly as automatic digital computers costing less than $150,000 or using less than 20 kilowatts of power.")
1955	Boston, MA	November 7–9	"Computers in Business and Industrial Systems"
1956	New York, NY	December 10–12	"New Developments in Computers"
1957	Washington, DC	December 9–13	
1958	Philadelphia, PA	December 3–5	
1959	Boston, MA	December 1–3	UNIVAC LARC
1960	New York, NY	December 13–15	
1961	Washington, DC	December 12–14	

=== Western Joint Computer Conference ===
Year	Location	Dates	Comments
1953	Los Angeles, CA	February 1–6	Subjects: "evaluation of digital and analog computers, commercial applications of computers, airplane problems, etc."
1954	Los Angeles, CA	February 11–12	"Trends in Computers: Automatic Control and Data Processing."
1955	Los Angeles, CA	March 1–3	"Functions and Techniques in Analog and Digital Computers"
1956	San Francisco, CA	February 7–9	
1957	Los Angeles, CA	February 26–28	"Techniques For Reliability"
1958	Los Angeles, CA	May 6–8	
1959	San Francisco, CA	March 3–5	
1960	San Francisco, CA	May 3–5	
1961	Los Angeles, CA	May 9–11	

=== Spring Joint Computer Conference ===
Year	Location	Dates	Comments
1962	San Francisco. CA	May 1–3	Exception to East Coast siting, FJCC was on East Coast. Compatible Time-Sharing System (CTSS)
1963	Detroit, MI	May 21–23	
1964	Washington, DC	April 21–23	
1965			
1966	Boston, MA	April 26–28	
1967	Atlantic City, NJ	April 18–20	
1968	Atlantic City, NJ	April 30-May 2	
1969	Boston, MA	May 14–16	
1970	Atlantic City, NJ	May 5–7	PDP-11
1971	Atlantic City, NJ	May 18–20	
1972	Atlantic City, NJ	May 16–18	

=== Fall Joint Computer Conference ===
Year	Location	Dates	Comments
1962	Philadelphia, PA	December 4–6	Exception to West Coast siting, SJCC was on West Coast.
1963	Las Vegas, NV	November 12–14	
1964	San Francisco, CA	October 27–29	General Motors DAC-1 CAD system
1965	Las Vegas, NV	November 30-December 1	Multics Operating System
1966	San Francisco, CA	November 7–10	
1967	Anaheim, CA	November 14–16	
1968	San Francisco, CA	December 9–11	XPL, "The Mother of All Demos"
1969	Las Vegas, NV	November 18–20	
1970	Houston, TX	November 17–19	Four-Phase IV/70
1971	Las Vegas, NV	November 16–18	
1972	Anaheim, CA	December 5–17	

=== National Computer Conference ===
Year	Location	Dates	Comments
1973	New York, NY	June 4–8	
1974	Chicago, IL	May 6–10	
1975	Anaheim, CA	May 19–22	ADM-3
1976	New York, NY	June 7–10	
1977	Dallas, TX	June 13–16	
1978	Anaheim, CA	June 5–8	
1979	New York, NY	June 4–7	
1980	Anaheim, CA	May 19–22	
1981	Chicago, IL	May 4–7	Xerox Star
1982	Houston, TX	June 7–10	Microcomputers prominent for first time
1983	Anaheim, CA	May 16–19	
1984	Las Vegas, NV	July 9–12	
1985	Chicago, IL	July 15–18	
1986	Dallas, TX	November 2–6	
1987	Chicago, IL	June 15–18	

== See also ==
- American Federation of Information Processing Societies
- COMDEX
