= Learn BASIC Now =

1989 computer programming book

- Cover of the MS-DOS Edition (1989)
- Author: Michael Halvorson; David Rygmyr
- Language: English
- Subject: BASIC programming language
- Publisher: Microsoft Press
- Publication date: 1989 (MS-DOS Edition); 1990 (Macintosh Edition)
- ISBN: 1-55615-240-X (MS-DOS); ISBN 1-55615-314-7 (Macintosh)

Learn BASIC Now is a book series written by Michael Halvorson and David Rygmyr, published by Microsoft Press. The primers introduced computer programming concepts to students and self-taught learners who were interested in creating games and application programs for early personal computers, including IBM-PC compatible systems and the Apple Macintosh.

Learn BASIC Now included three software disks containing the Microsoft QuickBASIC Interpreter 1.0 1989—later released as the ubiquitous Microsoft QBasic (1991-2000)—and the book’s sample programs. The books were influential in the popularization of the BASIC language and released during a significant growth phase of the personal computer industry when the installed base of BASIC programmers hit four million active users.

Since the books were distributed by Microsoft Press and featured a robust, menu-driven programming environment, Learn BASIC Now became an important catalyst for the learn-to-program movement, a broad-based computer literacy initiative in the 1980s and 1990s that encouraged people of all ages to learn to write computer programs.

== History ==
=== Early BASIC primers ===
When programming languages appeared in the 1950s and 60s, most of the early learning resources or manuals assumed their readers were engineers, mathematicians, or experienced tinkerers. When John G. Kemeny and Thomas E. Kurtz introduced Beginner’s All-Purpose Symbolic Instruction Code (BASIC) in 1963, they produced learning materials that described the language in a new way, emphasizing the language’s responsiveness and suitability for students.

BASIC was quickly implemented on time-sharing services, minicomputers, and the first microcomputers, and technology enthusiasts worked to bring programming skills to people with little or no experience in computing. For example, Bob Albrecht, co-founder of the People’s Computer Company Newsletter, published a BASIC primer designed to make programming exciting and enriching. My Computer Likes Me When I Speak BASIC (1972) taught programming using step-by-step instructions and examples from everyday life.

When Ted Nelson published Computer Lib/Dream Machines in 1974, he described computers as revolutionary devices that put the user in charge of their destiny. “The world is divided,” Nelson wrote, “into people who have written a program and people who have not.” Learning to program was described as a way to activate human agency and contribute to community solidarity.

BASIC Computer Games, Microcomputer Edition (1978), by David Ahl, drew attention to the emerging PC platform and how BASIC could be used to create interesting games and puzzles that were exciting to build. BASIC programming instruction also appeared in popular magazines. For example, columnist Dian Crayne published program listings and design tips in PC Magazine, inviting readers to construct their own adventure-type games using BASIC and assembly language.

BASIC dialects proliferated in the late-1980s, and software companies added an integrated development environment (IDE) and structured programming enhancements to their compilers and interpreters to attract more customers. Prominent examples included True BASIC (1985), Microsoft QuickBASIC (1985), Borland Turbo Basic (1987), and Microsoft BASIC Professional Development System (1989). Computer book publishers responded by publishing trade and academic books about BASIC and related products.

=== Microsoft Press ===
Microsoft Press, the book publishing division of Microsoft, had a history of producing books about PC programming, including The Peter Norton Programmer’s Guide to the IBM PC (1985) and Ray Duncan’s Advanced MS-DOS (1986). When Microsoft released QuickBASIC 4.5 for MS-DOS in 1988, Microsoft Press asked permission to distribute a scaled-down version of the product with a new programming primer that could speed the adoption of QuickBASIC and attract new customers to personal computing. The book-and-software product would sell for $39.95 and provide all the resources that new users would need to learn modern, structured programming techniques on a DOS-based computer.

Learn BASIC Now was written by Michael Halvorson and David Rygmyr, two Microsoft Press employees with experience in PC programming and technical writing. They completed the manuscript and MS-DOS sample programs over a period of five months in early 1989. The authors were assisted by staff editors Megan Sheppard and Dail Magee, Jr., and a team of artists, proofreaders, and compositors. The cover was designed by Greg Hickman, and the original illustrations were created by Becky Geisler-Johnson. The interior design featured multiple colors, original artwork, screen shots, and step-by-step programming instructions.

Each lesson in the MS-DOS edition of the book included QuickBASIC programs that the reader could type in on their own or they could load the programs from 5.25” disks included with the package.

The key feature that set the book apart from language references and other tutorials was that practice sessions were presented step by step using detailed instructions, keyboarding icons, a second color for user entry, and jargon-free terminology. These innovative elements were eventually transferred to the Step by Step book series published by Microsoft Press in the 1990s and 2000s.

== QuickBASIC Interpreter ==
QuickBASIC Interpreter 1.0 1989 was included with the Learn BASIC Now book and the combined product was a collaboration between two internal Microsoft groups. Microsoft Press (Learn ... Now book series) was the client that requested the QBI, and the Microsoft Languages Division (the developers of QuickBASIC) produced the software.

QBI.exe was based on QuickBASIC 4.5's QB.exe but without the ability to create executable files on disk. It lacked interrupt handling and signal monitoring, and limited the user's program code and data to 160K only. It also included the QuickBASIC Advisor system (three digital Help files), as well as QB Express, a Computer Based Training program (LEARN).

QuickBASIC Interpreter 1.0 1989 became the basis for the QBasic interpreter 1.0 1991. Both products presented the same IDE menus, the same language syntax, and the same execution limits. However, QBasic had a condensed Advisor (single help file) and lacked QB Express (LEARN).

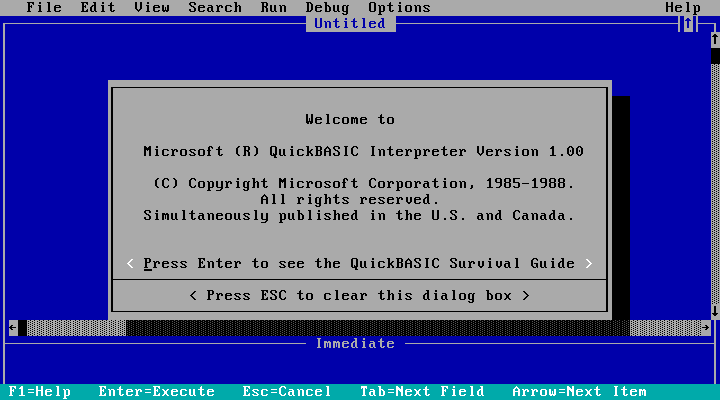
QuickBASIC Interpreter 1.0 Opening Screen

=== QuickBASIC Interpreter Family Pedigree ===
QBasic 1.0 1991 ← QuickBASIC Interpreter 1.0 1989 ← QuickBASIC 4.5 1988

== Contents ==
Learn BASIC Now was organized into 13 chapters and 4 appendices. Main topics included an introduction to problem solving, building algorithms, controlling program flow, creating subprograms and functions, working with arrays, string-processing techniques, using files and databases, and integrating graphics and sound into games. The text concluded with common debugging scenarios and answers to the questions and exercises presented in the text.

Bill Gates wrote the Foreword to the MS-DOS version of the book, emphasizing that the continuing PC Revolution required all people to participate: “We need a diverse community of users creating tools and solving problems to fully achieve the potential of the microcomputer,” Gates wrote.

Gates also described a universal BASIC-like language that would one day be built into computer applications. Microsoft’s implementation of this became Visual Basic for Applications, first launched in Microsoft Excel 5.0 in 1993.

Halvorson and Rygmyr's text encouraged readers to see programming and the rise of personal computing as positive forces in society. They acknowledged that popular media had depicted computers negatively in the past, but they encouraged people to see how PCs were becoming a part of everyday life:

"Hollywood and television have done a fine job of showing us how computers can take away jobs, make life more difficult, and take over the world. Despite this bad press, personal computers have entered the workplaces and homes of millions, allowing people to perform useful work that makes their lives easier and more productive. Computers have become an integral part of business, communication, entertainment, and scientific research. Because of their ease of use and increased power, people can use today’s personal computer as the tools they were designed to be."

== Reception ==
Learn BASIC Now was released in November 1989 and sold over 75,000 copies in its first edition. The book’s $39.95 retail price was higher than comparable primers, but competitive because the book included the Microsoft QuickBASIC Interpreter and QBI Advisor help system on three 5.25” disks.

Significant press coverage accompanied the publication of Learn BASIC Now. In its review of the book, the New York Times wrote, “For anyone who wants to learn something about programming, it would be hard to find an easier or more cost-effective source than Learn BASIC Now.” In 1990, Learn BASIC Now was runner up in the “How To” computer book category for a Computer Press Association award, the preeminent editorial award given in New York City by the computer and technology media.

== Related works ==
In 1990, Halvorson and Rygmyr published the Macintosh version of Learn BASIC Now, which included the Microsoft QuickBASIC Interpreter for Macintosh Plus, SE, and II systems on 3.5” diskettes. The book-and-software package was also published by Microsoft Press, following an arrangement with the Languages division of Microsoft to distribute a scaled-down version of QuickBASIC for the Macintosh.

Learn BASIC for the Apple Macintosh Now had considerable differences from the MS-DOS version, because the Macintosh was a fully graphical system and offered event-driven programming features. Byte (magazine) columnist and science fiction writer Jerry Pournelle wrote the Foreword to the book, emphasizing the value of learning programming as a gateway to future employment and personal fulfilment.

In 1990, Microsoft also released a book-and-software package for MS-DOS gaming audiences entitled Microsoft Game Shop: Games and the QBasic Learning Environment. The $49.95 software package included the MS-DOS version of Learn BASIC Now, the QBasic Interpreter, and a selection of customizable arcade-style games, including versions of Tetris and Missile Command.

Tony Roberts of Compute! wrote, "BASIC is an ideal first language... For learning to program, Microsoft Game Shop provides an excellent introduction with plenty of fun and useful tools. First time programmers have a chance to experience the challenge and excitement of the old days of computing, but with all the comforts afforded by today's technology."

=== Windows programming ===
In January 1996, Halvorson published Learn Visual Basic Now, a version of Learn BASIC Now for the Microsoft Windows operating system using Microsoft Visual Basic version 4.0. Like the first two Learn Now primers, the Microsoft Press book included a working version of the Visual Basic software and step-by-step instructions that presented game and application programming to new audiences, including students and self-taught learners.

Learn Visual Basic Now was a significant revision, replacing older BASIC keywords with newer object-oriented techniques and advice about designing applications for the popular Windows 95 system. In 1999, Learn Visual Basic Now was revised again to introduce Visual Basic 6.0, a program included on a CD-ROM bound into the book. Halvorson continued working on Visual Basic and Windows programming primers as a professor at Pacific Lutheran University, releasing 10 editions of Microsoft Visual Basic Step by Step between 1995 and 2013.

== Influence ==
Learn BASIC Now has been cited as a successful model for teaching self-taught learners programming skills in an era when computer instruction was expensive and difficult to obtain. Before the Internet changed teaching and learning methods in the late 1990s, printed books like Learn BASIC Now and Learn Visual Basic Now had considerable influence in user communities and schools, and contributed to the growth of personal computing and computer literacy.

Although BASIC programming is sometimes denigrated as hobbyist or amateur in academic circles, self-taught programmers, students, and office workers used BASIC and its successors to build valuable technical skills and enter the burgeoning computer industry. In the late 1980s and early 1990s, BASIC was one of the most popular programming languages and closely related to the rise of computing as a social and cultural phenomenon.

== Recommended reading ==
- Bob Albrecht, My Computer Loves Me When I Speak BASIC (Portland, OR: Dilithium Press, 1972).
- David H. Ahl, ed., 101 BASIC Computer Games (Maynard, MA: Digital Equipment Corporation, 1973).
- Clive Thompson, Coders: The Making of a New Tribe and the Remaking of the World (New York, NY: Penguin Press, 2019).
- Thomas Haigh and Paul E. Ceruzzi, A New Modern History of Computing (Cambridge, MA: The MIT Press, 2021).
- Michael J. Halvorson, Code Nation: Personal Computing and the Learn to Program Movement in America (ACM Books / Morgan & Claypool, 2020).
- John G. Kemeny and Thomas E. Kurtz, Back to BASICs: The History, Corruption, and Future of the Language (Reading, MA: Addison-Wesley, 1985).
- Steven Levy, Hackers: Heroes of the Computer Revolution (Garden City, NY: Anchor Press/Doubleday, 1984; Revised edition, Sebastopol, CA: O’Reilly, 2010).
- Ted Nelson, Computer Lib/ Dream Machines, Second Edition (Redmond, WA: Microsoft Press, 1987).
- Joy Lisi Rankin, A People’s History of Computing in the United States (Cambridge, MA: Harvard University Press, 2018).
