= QuickC =

IDE for the C programming language

- Developer: Microsoft
- Initial release: October 1987; 38 years ago
- Stable release: 2.51 / 1990; 36 years ago
- Written in: C
- Operating system: MS-DOS
- Type: IDE
- License: Proprietary

QuickC for Windows
- Developer: Microsoft
- Initial release: September 1991; 34 years ago
- Stable release: 1.00 / September 1991; 34 years ago
- Written in: C
- Operating system: Microsoft Windows
- Type: IDE
- License: Proprietary

Microsoft QuickC is a discontinued commercial integrated development environment (IDE) product engineered by Microsoft for the C programming language, superseded by Visual C++ Standard Edition. Its main competitor was Borland Turbo C.

QuickC is one of three Microsoft programming languages with IDEs of this type marketed in the same period, the other two being QuickBasic and QuickPascal. QuickBasic later gave rise to Visual Basic as well as being included without a linker as QBasic in later versions of MS-DOS, replacing GW-BASIC. QuickC is a lineal ancestor of Visual C++. The three Quick language implementations were designed for power users (as opposed to professional developers, whom Microsoft supplied with programming languages in the form of expensive and more comprehensive implementations for the three languages in question as well as C++, Fortran, and Cobol) and educational use; in all three cases their major competitor was Borland with its Turbo compiler series. Microsoft Macro Assembler also competes with Borland's Turbo Assembler

QuickC was a real mode target only compiler, with the exception of QuickC for Windows 1.0 which also allowed to compile protected mode programs, but only for Windows.

== Version history ==
- QuickC 1.0, released in October 1987. It implements the ANSI C standard and is Microsoft C 5.0 compatible. CodeView is also supported. The release had known compatibility issues with WD HDD controllers.
- QuickC 1.01
- QuickC 2.0, released in January 1989. New features included: incremental compiling and linking, improved compilation speed, built-in assembler and support for all memory models. It was Microsoft C 5.1 compatible.
- QuickC 2.01, released in June 1989. Quick Assembler was included in this release. It was Microsoft Source Profiler compatible.
- QuickC 2.50, released in May 1990.
- QuickC 2.51, released in December 1990 (Only available with the bundled Assembler)
- QuickC for Windows 1.0, released in September 1991. It was the first integrated development environment (IDE) for C on Windows and was also available in a bundle with Microsoft C 6.0 and Windows SDK. The IDE made use of some undocumented Windows API calls. It was still possible to target DOS with this version, but these DOS programs were limited to real mode programs.

== See also ==
- QuickBASIC - similar development environment for BASIC programming
- Open Watcom C/C++ - free x86 C/C++/Fortran compiler for DOS, OS/2, Windows, Linux
