= PowerBASIC =

Software compiler

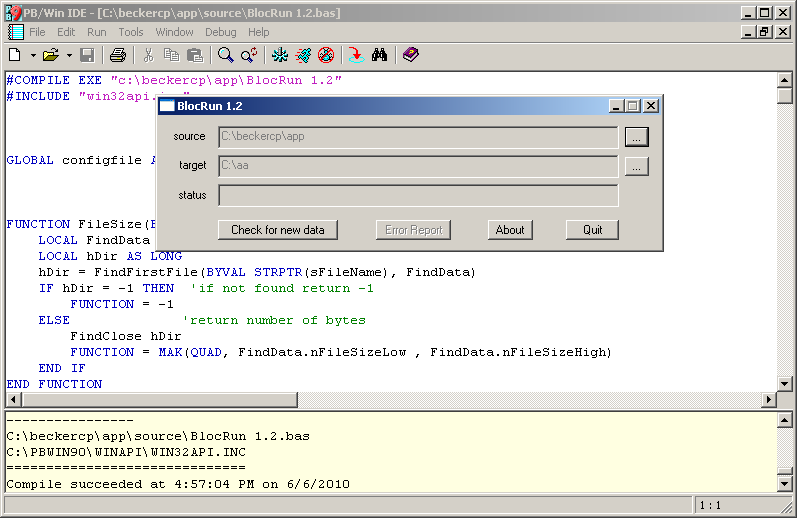
- Screenshot of PowerBASIC for Windows 9.0 IDE and an example compiled Windows GUI.
- Developer: Robert "Bob" S Zale (b. 1945, d. 2012)
- First appeared: 1990; 36 years ago
- Stable release: PB/Win 10.0 (4 May 2011; 15 years ago); PB/DOS 3.50 (16 December 1997; 28 years ago)
- OS: Windows (32-bit only), MS-DOS
- Website: URL (archived 2024)

Influenced by
- Turbo BASIC

PowerBASIC, formerly Turbo BASIC, was the brand of several commercial compilers by PowerBASIC Inc. that compiled a dialect of the BASIC programming language. There were both MS-DOS and Windows versions, and two kinds of the latter: Console and Windows. The MS-DOS version had a syntax similar to that of QBasic and QuickBASIC. The Windows versions used a BASIC syntax expanded to include many Windows functions, and the statements could be combined with calls to the Windows API.

== History ==
=== BASIC/Z for CP/M and MDOS ===
The compiler was originally published as BASIC/Z, the first interactive compiler for CP/M and MDOS (Micropolis DOS). BASIC/Z was designed and created by Robert "Bob" S Zale (1945–2012). Later it was extended to MS-DOS compatible operating systems.

=== Borland Turbo BASIC for DOS ===
In 1987 Borland purchased the full rights to BASIC/Z and rebranded it Turbo Basic 1.0-1.1, which was compatible with QuickBASIC 3.0, GW-BASIC 3.2 and BASICA 3.3.

=== PowerBASIC for DOS ===
In late 1988-early 1989, Borland decided to abandon future development of Turbo BASIC after the successful release of Microsoft QuickBASIC 4.5-4.0. Bob Zale, in 1989, purchased back all the rights to Turbo BASIC source code, renamed it PowerBASIC and set up PowerBASIC Inc. to continue further development and support. In May 1990, PowerBASIC 2.0 was published by Spectra Publishing and supported many features compatible with QuickBASIC 4.5 and additional enhancements. As PowerBASIC gained popularity as it produced smaller size executables than Micrososft's, PowerBASIC Inc directly published release 3.0 in 1993 which added most features of PDS 7.1 and VBDOS 1.0 — with the exception of ISAM and OS/2 — and added many enhanced features. The final release for DOS was PowerBASIC 3.5, in 1997. With the advent of the Windows versions of PowerBASIC, the original PowerBASIC for DOS was retro branded as PB/DOS.

=== PowerBASIC for DOS (PBDOS) Family Pedigree ===
[aka PB/DOS] PowerBASIC 3.5 1997 ← PowerBASIC 3.0 1993 ← PowerBASIC 2.0 1990 ← Borland Turbo BASIC 1.1/1.0 1987 ← BASIC/Z 1.11 1983 for CP/M

=== PowerBASIC for Windows ===
PowerBASIC went on to develop BASIC compilers for Windows, first PBWIN — their flagship product — and then PBCC, described below.

On November 6, 2012, Robert Zale died. For a time, it was assumed that the company would quickly cease operations. His wife, Vivian Zale, posted on March 8, 2014 to the PowerBASIC forums that the company would continue operations. On May 10, 2015, Vivian Zale announced that work was continuing on new versions of PowerBASIC compilers.

On November 2, 2016, Vivian Zale announced her intention to seek a buyer for the company.

On January 31, 2017, Adam Drake announced Drake Software had acquired PowerBASIC source code from PowerBASIC, Inc., with the intention of updating and improving the functionality of the product. This was later confirmed by Vivian Zale with a forum post thanking the members for their support.

=== PowerBASIC Epilogue ===
When Bob Zale died, PBWin11 and PBCC7 were in beta testing, and 64-bit compilers and PB/Pro (PBWin and CC in one compiler) were in the alpha stages. However, development of PowerBASIC products stopped. No new version has been released since v10.04 2011 (15 years ago as of May 2026). No 64-bit version or beta release has been announced. No development activity has been reported. No corrections (such as adding the correct DPI settings for the IDE) have been released. PowerBASIC Tools LLC no longer sells new licenses for the 32-bit Windows compilers. The PowerBASIC website was taken down in 2025.

== Compilers ==
PowerBASIC programs are self-contained and use no runtime file to execute. In all versions of the compiler, the applications compile without external libraries, though it can use such libraries if needed. PBDOS creates 16-bit DOS MZ executable files, while PBWIN and PBCC create 32-bit Portable Executable (PE) files.

=== Turbo BASIC ===
Borland's Turbo BASIC contains extensions to classic BASIC (without breaking compatibility), such as a drawing API and mouse access.

Unlike most BASIC implementations of its time, Turbo Basic was a full compiler which generated native code for MS-DOS. Other implementations were either interpreters, or relied heavily on a runtime library. The integrated development environment could run a BASIC program internally for traditional BASIC debugging (see sample below), or generate an MS-DOS stand-alone executable file that could be run on other systems without the Turbo Basic product or runtime libraries.

==== Code example ====
The following program is an example of the ALGOL-like BASIC dialect that Turbo Basic supported. Unlike traditional BASIC, which used line numbers and had limited control structures and no support for ALGOL-like subroutines, modern BASIC dialects starting at this period were extended to make the language compatible with modern structured programming style by making line numbers optional and adding the control structures and subroutine definitions needed for structured programming.

INPUT "What is your name?: ", n$
PRINT "Hello "; n$
DO
  s$ = ""
  INPUT "How many stars do you want to print"; s
  FOR i = 1 TO s
    s$ = s$ + "*"
  NEXT i
  PRINT s$
  DO
    INPUT "Do you want to print more stars"; q$
  LOOP WHILE LEN(q$) = 0
  q$ = LCASE$(LEFT$(q$, 1))
LOOP WHILE q$ = "y"
PRINT "Goodbye "; n$

(s$ is a string and s is a single-precision floating-point (number). They are separate variables.)

Like the other Borland products of this era, the code executes within the integrated development environment.

=== PowerBASIC for MS-DOS (PBDOS) ===
PB/DOS included an Integrated Development Environment and supported MS-DOS 3.30 and all later versions. PowerBASIC 3.5 1997 $149 for DOS was the final release, retro branded PB/DOS 3.5. PowerBASIC 3.0 1993 $149 gained popularity quickly after Microsoft ended DOS only PDS 7.1 and VBDOS 1.0. PowerBASIC 2.0 1990 $129 was the initial release as the successor to Borland Turbo BASIC 1.1 1988-1987 1.0 which itself evolved from Bob Zale's BASIC/Z 1.11 1983 for CP/M and MDOS (Micropolis DOS) for the Zilog Z80].

PowerBASIC popularity stemmed from three main factors:

- Rich Features [superset of PDS 7.1, QuickBASIC 4.5, QBasic 1.1, GW-BASIC 3.23]
- Updated DOS Product through 1997 [both Microsoft and Borland dropped DOS only products during 1990-1993]
- Low Price $149 [$99 switching from Microsoft or Borland, $59 upgrading from an older PowerBASIC]

In addition, PowerBASIC was efficient (fast edit/compile), robust (stable/relatively bugs free), and a user-friendly IDE (menus and editor commands familiar to DOS developers).

==== Rich Features ====
PowerBASIC 3.5 had a rich superset of features that were compatible with most of PDS 7.1 1990 [excluding ISAM and OS/2], QuickBASIC 4.5 1988, QBasic 1.1 1993 [unchanged through WinMe 2000 (CD:\Tools\OldMSDOS)], GW-BASIC 3.23 1989, BASICA 3.40 1992, MBASIC 5.28 1983; and even VBDOS 1.0 1992 [QuickBASIC language; excluding RAD, forms, controls, etc] plus numerous added enhancements.

==== Updated DOS Product ====
Through the end of 1997, PowerBASIC 3.5 offered an up to date BASIC compiler that required only plain DOS.

- Microsoft dropped new releases of exclusively DOS products starting in 1990 through 1993 [QBasic 1.1 unchanged since 3/10/1993, VBDOS 1.0 8/19/1992, PDS 7.1 6/24/1990, QuickBASIC 4.5 10/21/1988] and limited its support to minor product updates only. The only exception was DOS itself, which continued to receive major releases up to 1994 [DOS 6.00 3/10/1993 and the final DOS 6.22 5/31/1994].
- Borland dropped new releases of DOS only products starting in 1992 through 1993 [Borland Pascal with Objects 7.01 3/9/1993, Borland C++ 3.1 6/10/1992; Turbo BASIC 1.1 11/4/1987]

==== Low Price ====
New customer's list price was $149; far less than Microsoft's $495 list price of PDS 7.1 or VBDOS 1.0. Most customers paid discounted prices:

- $99 for those switching from Microsoft VBDOS/PDS/QuickBASIC or Borland Turbo BASIC
- $59 for existing PowerBASIC customer upgrading from any older PowerBASIC version

==== PBDOS Fading ====
- Source Code modification — PowerBASIC was not a drop in replacement for Microsoft PDS/QuickBASIC/QBasic/GW-BASIC as the enhanced features required source code changes.
- Shrinking Market share — DOS-only user base and DOS applications were drastically eroded by 1997 due to the rapid expansion of the WFW 3.11/Windows 3.11, Windows 95, and WinNT 4.0 user bases.
- Technical Resources — limited availability of books, forums, and experts that discussed PowerBASIC's enhanced features/capabilities.

=== PowerBASIC Console Compiler (PBCC) ===
PBCC is a 32-bit compiler for the Windows 9x series and Windows NT series of operating systems, including Windows XP, Windows Server 2008, Windows Vista, and Windows 7. PBCC applications can use dynamic-link libraries (DLLs). The compiler comes with an IDE including an editor and stepping debugger.

No knowledge of Windows programming is required to create character mode or graphical applications with this compiler. PBCC-compiled executables can also be used as Common Gateway Interface executables (for web servers).

PBCC creates only executables, not DLLs. (PBWin — see below — can create both.)

=== PowerBASIC Compiler for Windows (PBWin) ===
PBWin is a 32-bit compiler compatible with the Windows 9x series and the Windows NT series of operating systems, including Windows XP, Windows Server 2008, Windows Vista, Windows 7, Windows 8 (8.1), Windows 10 and Windows 11 PBWin can create dynamic-link libraries. PBWin applications can read dynamic-link libraries]. PBWin comes with a compiler, IDE with editor, and stepping debugger.

==== Dynamic Dialog Tools (DDT) ====
You can create an application's graphical user interface using the Windows API, or by using the built-in DDT language extensions. The group of BASIC statements which wrap Windows API functions, particularly in the creation and handling of dialog boxes and child controls, is collectively known as Dynamic Dialog Tools. Using DDT requires less coding than to create a similar program using the Windows API. Using the DDT and the Windows API (known as SDK style as in Microsoft Windows SDK) are not mutually exclusive.

==== Trial versions of compilers ====
PowerBASIC renamed PBWin v9.07 and PB/CC v5.07 as "Classic PBWin" and "Classic PB/CC", respectively, and on November 1, 2016, offered them for a short time through their online store as free, no-nag, trial versions along with PBForms v1.0 (PowerBASIC Forms).

== Tools ==
=== PB Forms ===
PowerBASIC Forms, available for purchase separately, is a graphical user interface design tool add-on for PBWin. It automatically produces source code using the DDT language extension that creates forms using the Windows graphical user interface.

=== COM Browser ===
The PowerBASIC COM Browser, which comes with PBWin, is an application that exposes the interfaces, methods, and properties of COM objects, as described by type-library files. The PowerBASIC COM Browser exports an interface structure of a COM object for early-binding purposes in PowerBASIC code, and gives syntax reference and context-help on the interface members exposed by a COM object.

== Programming language ==
=== Characteristics ===
PowerBASIC is a native-code BASIC compiler whose reported merits are simplicity of use and speed compared to other languages. Although the compiled code is fast enough for most purposes, the compilers also support inline assembler which can be used for hand optimization of critical routines. The Windows compilers (PBWin & PBCC) support almost all of the x86 instruction set, including FPU, SIMD, and MMX, the main exceptions being a few which are useful mostly to systems programmers. One can insert any unsupported instructions by inserting their opcodes with the "db", "dw", and "dd" statements. Lines of assembler code can be freely interspersed with lines of BASIC code, although one must always consider the potential interactions between the two types of code.

=== Hello world ===
Hello world is used to give a very small example of the syntax used by a programming language and is often the smallest possible program for any given programming language.

Here is an example of a PBCC hello world program. By default PBCC creates a console window at runtime for displaying output. The use of Waitkey$ in this example prevents the console window from automatically closing until the operator sees the displayed text.

Function PBMain

  Print "Hello, World!"
  Waitkey$

End Function

Here is the PBWin version, which displays a Windows "dialog" message box.

Function PBMain

  MsgBox "Hello, World!"

End Function

=== Structured control statements ===
These structured control statements eliminate many instances that would require the use of GOTO and labels:

- iterate - skips ahead to the next iteration of the loop containing it (iterate do, iterate loop, iterate for), like the continue statement in most languages
- exit - sends execution to just after the loop (exit for, exit do, exit loop), conditional (exit if, exit select), or block (exit function, exit sub) containing it, like the break statement in most languages

=== Object-oriented programming ===
PBWin and PBCC support object-oriented programming in the form of COM classes, however the compilers do not force you to use OOP, it is merely an option. In-process and out-of-process COM Servers can also be built using these compilers.

==== Graphics ====
Both the Console Compiler and Windows Compiler can create graphic windows. The GRAPHICs statements are higher-level than Windows' Graphics Device Interface (GDI) library functions.

===== Elements of the GRAPHIC statements =====
GRAPHIC WINDOWS are dedicated dialogs each containing a single control which fills the dialog's client area. GRAPHIC controls are child windows which support the same GRAPHIC drawing functionality as GRAPHIC windows. GRAPHIC BITMAPS are also defined, again supporting the GRAPHIC drawing functionality, but as purely memory objects, like Windows bitmaps or DIB sections. Keyboard and mouse handling statements are included among the GRAPHIC statements. Character output to a GRAPHIC target uses fonts specified via the FONT NEW statement.

===== Creating a GRAPHIC WINDOW application =====
A GRAPHIC WINDOW is the equivalent of a Windows dialog box containing a static control on which drawing operations can be done. A single BASIC statement will create a GRAPHIC WINDOW and specify its size, position and title. It is not essential to specify a WNDPROC for the GRAPHIC WINDOW. A short source code example for a complete GRAPHIC WINDOW application follows:

#Compile Exe ' using either PBCC6 or PBWIN10 compiler
#Dim All

Function PBMain
    Local GW As Dword
    ' start a GRAPHIC WINDOW
    Graphic Window New "graphic window", 100, 100, 200, 200 to GW
    ' show a coloured disc
    Graphic Ellipse (10, 10)-(190, 190), %rgb_Red, %rgb_SeaGreen, 0
    ' wait for a keypress
    Graphic Waitkey$
End Function

===== Comparison of PB GRAPHIC statements with the GDI API =====
Using PB GRAPHIC statements, a GRAPHIC (WINDOW, BITMAP, or control) is first selected as the current GRAPHIC target, then operations are done on it without requiring it to be identified again. Contrast this with the GDI API approach, where the Device Context handle is required for every drawing operation.

It is not necessary when using the PB GRAPHIC statements to define a brush or pen as a separate entity, nor is it necessary to redraw the GRAPHIC target (when in view) in response to Windows messages such as WM_PAINT and WM_ERASEBKGND. GRAPHIC targets are persistent.

When GRAPHIC targets are attached, a REDRAW option can be specified which buffers the results of drawing operations until they are specifically requested. Using this technique reduces flicker in a similar way to the technique of drawing on memory DCs when using the GDI API.

Pixel operations are possible using the GRAPHIC GET|SET PIXEL statements, in a manner similar to GetPixel/SetPixel of the GDI API. GRAPHIC GET BITS allows the entire bitmap to be loaded into a dynamic string. This can be manipulated either as a string or by mapping an array onto it. It can be placed back into the GRAPHIC target by GRAPHIC SET BITS.

===== Complementarity of GRAPHIC statements and the Windows GDI API =====
The GRAPHIC statements contain all the commonly used GDI API functions, but if you need one that is not included it is possible to obtain the hDC of any GRAPHIC target and thereby use GDI API functions on it.

== User community ==
PowerBASIC provides an online forum for users to ask questions and share knowledge. On 8 July 2012 the forum had 5,623 members (only a fraction of them still active) and contained 50,093 threads comprising 408,642 posts since August 26, 1998. The Source Code section alone contained 3,768 threads.

In early 2024 the main PowerBASIC website was switched to "under construction". This was heavily discussed in PB forums. As documented by the IP-rights owner the website will not come back, but the forums would remain active. In the fall of 2025 the forum sub-domain became inaccessible.

In response to the inaccessibility of the vendor-sponsored forums, a committee of major PowerBASIC contributors was elected to establish a new, community-funded and managed forum. In September 2025, members of the PowerBASIC user community established pbusers.org as an independent discussion forum to preserve continuity of discussion and knowledge sharing among users of PowerBASIC after access to the original forums was lost. The site is operated and crowd-funded by community members, and follows guidelines modeled after those of the original PowerBASIC Peer Support Community. In addition to hosting new discussions, the forum provides access to a searchable database of historical PowerBASIC forum threads based on the gbThreads archive. This database allows users to search and reference text-based posts from legacy discussions.
