= Personal environmental impact accounting =

Personal environmental impact accounting (PEIA) is a computer software-based methodology developed in 1992 by Don Lotter for quantifying an individual's impact on the environment via analysis of answers to an extensive quantity-based questionnaire that the individual fills out regarding their lifestyle. The questions are arranged in six areas: home energy and water, transportation, consumerism, waste, advocacy, and demographics.

== Conception ==
Lotter, at the time a graduate student in ecology at the University of California, Davis, developed the PEIA methodology while teaching a course on the History of Western Consciousness in the UC Davis Experimental College. He realized that, while individuals in contemporary Western society generally have an enormous environmental impact, most were unaware of it, and no method existed for its quantification or assessment.

== Development ==
The first software version of the PEIA methodology was EnviroAccount for MS-DOS, written in QuickBasic and completed in 1992. The program asked users 115 questions, then provided a score to indicate the user's personal environmental impact.

Lotter later created EarthAware, released in 1996, which built from EnviroAccount, and ran on Windows 3.1. EarthAware provided internet links for users to learn more about their environmental impact. After the test, users could print out their test results and areas for improvement. They would also receive a label ranging from "Eco-Titan" for the most environmentally friendly to "Eco-Tyrannosaurus Rex" for those "bound for extinction" doing the most harm to the planet.

Lotter also authored a book on the topic, EarthScore: Your Personal Environmental Audit and Guide.

== See also ==
PEIA is similar in concept to the ecological footprint.
