= Code complete =

Code complete can refer to:

- A stage of the software release life cycle
- Code Complete, a book on software development by Steve McConnell

== See also ==
- Code completion - a practical feature of IDEs during the process of a programming
  - Autocomplete#In source code editors
