= Michael Halvorson =

American technology writer and historian

- Halvorson in 2019
- Born: Michael James Halvorson; March 1, 1963 (age 63)
- Education: Pacific Lutheran University
- Occupations: Historian and technology writer

Michael James Halvorson (born 1 March 1963) is an American historian, technology writer, and professor. He worked at Microsoft Corporation from 1985 to 1993 during the formative years of the personal computer industry and later became known for his work on programming education, the history of computing, innovation studies, Reformation Europe, and oral history. He is the author or coauthor of more than forty books related to computing, software, and technology culture, including Learn BASIC Now (1989), the Visual Basic Step by Step series (1995-2013), and Code Nation: Personal Computing and the Learn To Program Movement in America (2020).

Since 2003, Halvorson has served on the faculty of Pacific Lutheran University (PLU) in Tacoma, Washington, where he teaches courses on European history, technology, media culture, and video games and historical representation. From 2016 to 2026, he served as Benson Family Chair in Business and Economic History.

== Early life and education ==
Halvorson grew up in Olympia, Washington. He received a Bachelor of Arts degree in Computer Science from Pacific Lutheran University in 1985, and later earned MA and Ph.D. degrees in History from the University of Washington. His scholarly and public work has frequently explored the relationship between technological systems, liberal arts education, public knowledge, and historical memory.

== Microsoft and technical publishing ==
In November 1985, Halvorson joined Microsoft Corporation in Bellevue, Washington, as employee #850. During his years at Microsoft, he worked as a technical editor, acquisitions editor, localization project manager, and publishing professional associated with Microsoft Press and the company’s early software development culture.

As an acquisitions editor at Microsoft Press, Halvorson worked with technology authors including Ray Duncan, Dan Gookin, Steve McConnell, Jerry Pournelle, Neil Salkind, and Van Wolverton. He also worked on localization projects related to Visual Basic for MS-DOS.

Between the late 1980s and early 2010s, Halvorson authored or co-authored more than forty books on programming, operating systems, and personal computing. His best-known early title was Learn BASIC Now (1989), a programming primer co-authored with David Rygmyr that included a foreword by Bill Gates and received the Computer Press Association runner-up award for “Best How-To Book” published in 1989. A review in The New York Times described the book as an accessible introduction to programming for beginning users.

Halvorson later wrote a series of books on Microsoft Office and Microsoft Visual Basic, including the long-running Microsoft Visual Basic Step by Step series, which helped introduce graphical user interface programming and Windows-based software development to students and independent programmers during the 1990s and early 2000s.

In Running Microsoft Office 2000, Halvorson attempted to calm fears about the pending Y2K problem (or Millennium bug), which he and co-author Michael Young believed was driven by popular hysteria.

== Academic career and scholarship ==
Since 2003, Halvorson has taught history at Pacific Lutheran University. His teaching and research interests include early modern Europe, Reformation history, the history of technology, innovation studies, media culture, and the social impact of computing. He co-founded PLU’s Innovation Studies program in 2017 and served as its inaugural director through 2024.

In 2009, Halvorson was appointed a research fellow at the Herzog August Library in Wolfenbüttel, Germany. His work there contributed to the monograph Heinrich Heshusius and Confessional Polemic in Early Lutheran Orthodoxy (2010), a study of Lutheran preaching, confessional identity, and political culture in Reformation Germany. He has also published articles in Archive for Reformation History, Lutheran Quarterly, Sixteenth Century Journal, and other scholarly journals.

Halvorson’s later scholarship increasingly examined computing culture and digital transformation. His book Code Nation: Personal Computing and the Learn to Program Movement in America (2020) used printed sources and oral history methods to explore programming literacy, hobbyist computing culture, and debates about access to technical education in the United States.

He has also taught courses on video games, media culture, and historical representation, including interdisciplinary work on history and game design.

== Oral history and public humanities ==
In 2024, Halvorson served as Senior Oral Historian for Microsoft Alumni Voices, an oral-history initiative organized by the Microsoft Alumni Network in conjunction with Microsoft’s fiftieth anniversary. The project recorded interviews with former Microsoft employees involved in software development, engineering, publishing, and company culture.

Halvorson has also written publicly about rare books and archives, historical memory, trauma-informed research practices, and the emotional dimensions of historical work.

== Selected books ==
- Michael J. Halvorson and Shelly Cano Kurtz, This Little World: A How-To Guide for Social Innovators (Abingdon, UK, and New York: Routledge, 2024).
- Michael J. Halvorson, Code Nation: Personal Computing and the Learn to Program Movement in America (New York: ACM Books / Morgan & Claypool, 2020).
- Michael Halvorson, The Renaissance: All That Matters (London: Hodder and Stoughton / New York: McGraw-Hill, 2014).
- Michael Halvorson, Microsoft Visual Basic 2013 Step by Step (Sebastopol, CA: O'Reilly Media, 2013).
- Michael J. Halvorson, Heinrich Heshusius and Confessional Polemic in Early Lutheran Orthodoxy (St. Andrews Studies in Reformation History, Ashgate Publishing, England, 2010). Reissued by Routledge in paperback in 2024.
- Michael J. Halvorson and Karen E. Spierling, eds., Defining Community in Early Modern Europe (St. Andrews Studies in Reformation History, Ashgate Publishing, England, 2008).
- Michael Halvorson and Michael Young, Running Microsoft Office 2000 Professional, Microsoft Press (Redmond, WA, 1999).
- Michael Halvorson, Microsoft Visual Basic 6.0 Professional Step by Step, Microsoft Press (Redmond, WA, 1998).
- Michael Halvorson and David Rygmyr, Learn BASIC Now, Microsoft Press (Redmond, WA, 1989).
