= Gorillas (video game) =

- Developer: Microsoft
- Publisher: Microsoft
- Platform: MS-DOS
- Release: 1990; 36 years ago
- Genre: Artillery
- Mode: hotseat

Gorillas, also known under the source code's 8.3 filename GORILLA.BAS, is a video game first distributed with MS-DOS 5 and published in 1990 by Microsoft. It is a turn-based artillery game. With allusions to King Kong, the game consists of two gorillas throwing explosive bananas at each other above a city skyline. The players can adjust the angle and velocity of each throw.

Written in QBasic, it is one of the programs included as a demonstration of that programming language. The others are Nibbles (another game), Money (a simple financial calculator), and REMLINE (a program to remove line numbers from old BASIC programs).

== QB64 version ==
QB64 included a copy of Gorillas, adapted to be run at proper speed, until it was removed due to copyright concerns. As the compiler does not support DEF FN for inline functions, the original code was also adapted to use regular functions.

== Gameplay ==
Before the game begins, two players enter their names, choose a target score, and set a gravity value that governs the physics of the match. The default gravity is 9.8 m/s², though any value may be selected.

At the start of each round, two gorillas spawn on opposite sides of a randomly generated cityscape composed of buildings with varying heights and widths. Players take turns entering a launch angle and velocity to chuck a banana at the opposing player.

Each banana’s trajectory is influenced by the selected launch angle and velocity, as well as by the chosen gravity value and wind. Wind conditions vary in both direction and strength from round to round and are displayed as a red vector arrow beneath the map.

When bananas land, they explode. Impacts on buildings blow away a small chunk of the structure, which can allow players to create openings through buildings in order to hit the opposing gorilla. When a gorilla is struck by a banana, the opposing player scores a point and the round immediately ends. A new map is then generated for the next round, and play continues until one player reaches the target score set at the beginning of the game.

== See also ==
- NIBBLES.BAS
- DONKEY.BAS
