= Neil Konzen =

Neil Konzen is a computer programmer who formerly worked for Microsoft as one of its earliest employees. He was the systems programmer of Microsoft's Macintosh programs projects, including Multiplan and Word for the Mac in 1984. He was later tasked with leading the team that created the second version of Windows at Microsoft, after the failure of the original version.

Konzen created, with Bill Gates, the DONKEY.BAS game for the IBM PC.
