= GW-BASIC =

Dialect of the BASIC programming language

- Developer: Microsoft
- First appeared: 1983; 43 years ago
- Stable release: 3.23 / 1988; 38 years ago
- OS: DOS
- License: Proprietary; MIT License (v1.0)

Influenced by
- IBM Cassette BASIC, IBM Disk BASIC, IBM BASICA

Influenced
- QBasic, QuickBasic, MSX BASIC

GW-BASIC is a dialect of the BASIC programming language developed by Microsoft from IBM BASICA. Functionally identical to BASICA, its BASIC interpreter is a fully self-contained executable and does not need the Cassette BASIC ROM found in the original. It was bundled with MS-DOS operating systems on IBM PC–compatibles by Microsoft.

The language is suitable for simple games, business programs and the like. Since it was included with most versions of MS-DOS, it was also a low-cost way for many aspiring programmers to learn the fundamentals of computer programming. Microsoft also sold a BASIC compiler, BASCOM, compatible with GW-BASIC, for programs needing more speed.

According to Mark Jones Lorenzo, given the scope of the language, "GW-BASIC is arguably the ne plus ultra of Microsoft's family of line-numbered BASICs stretching back to Altair BASIC — and perhaps even of line-numbered BASIC in general."

With the release of MS-DOS 5.0, GW-BASIC's place was taken by QBasic, a slightly abridged version of the interpreter part of the separately available QuickBASIC interpreter and compiler package.

On May 21, 2020, Microsoft released the 8088 assembler source code for GW-BASIC 1.0 on GitHub under the MIT License.

== Features ==
IBM BASICA and GW-BASIC are largely ports of MBASIC version 5.x, but with added features specifically for the IBM PC hardware. Common features of BASIC-80 5.x and BASICA/GW-BASIC include:

- WHILE...WEND loops
- Variable names of up to 40 characters
- OPTION BASE statement to set the starting index of array variables as either 0 or 1
- Dynamic string space allocation
- LINE INPUT, which allowed field-separator characters like comma to be ignored
- CALL statement for executing machine-language routines
- CHAIN and MERGE commands
- Ability to save programs in either tokenized binary format or ASCII text

The ability to "crunch" program lines by omitting spaces, a common feature of earlier Microsoft BASIC implementations, was removed from BASIC-80 5.x and BASICA/GWBASIC.

BASIC-80 programs not using PEEK/POKE statements run under GW-BASIC. BASICA adds many features for the IBM PC such as sound, graphics, and memory commands. Features not present in BASIC-80 include the ability to execute the RND function with no parameters and the ability to also save programs in a "protected" format, preventing them from being LISTed. BASICA also allows double-precision numbers to be used with mathematical and trigonometric functions such as COS, SIN, and ATN, which wasn't allowed in 8-bit versions of BASIC. This feature was normally not enabled and required the optional parameter /D at startup, i.e., GWBASIC /D. BASIC's memory footprint was slightly increased if it was used.

Microsoft did not offer a generic version of MS-DOS until v3.20 in 1986; before then, all variants of the operating system were OEM versions. Depending on the OEM, BASIC was distributed as either BASICA.EXE or GWBASIC.EXE. The former should not be confused with IBM BASICA, which always came as a COM file. Some variants of BASIC have extra features to support particular machines. For example, the AT&T and Tandy versions of DOS include a special GW-BASIC that supports their enhanced sound and graphics capabilities.

The initial version of GW-BASIC is the one included with Compaq DOS 1.13, released with the Compaq Portable in 1983, and was analogous to IBM BASICA 1.10. It uses the CP/M-derived file control blocks for disk access and does not support subdirectories. Later versions support subdirectories, improved graphics, and other capabilities.

GW-BASIC 3.20 (1986) adds EGA graphics support (no version of BASICA or GW-BASIC had VGA support) and is the last major new version released before it was superseded by QBasic.

Buyers of Hercules Graphics Cards received a special version of GW-BASIC on the card's utility disk that is called HBASIC, which adds support for its 720×348 monochrome graphics. Other versions of BASICA/GW-BASIC do not support Hercules graphics and can only display graphics on that card through the use of third-party CGA emulation, such as SIMCGA.

GW-BASIC has a command-line-based integrated development environment (IDE) based on Dartmouth BASIC. Using the cursor movement keys, any line displayed on the screen can be edited. It also includes function key shortcuts at the bottom of the screen. Like other early microcomputer versions of BASIC, GW-BASIC lacks many of the structures needed for structured programming, such as local variables. GW-BASIC programs executed relatively slowly because it was an interpreted language. All program lines must be numbered; all non-numbered lines are considered to be commands in direct mode to be executed immediately. Program source files are normally saved in binary compressed format with tokens replacing keywords, with an option to save in ASCII text form.

The GW-BASIC command-line environment has commands to RUN, LOAD, SAVE, LIST the current program, or quit to the operating SYSTEM; these commands can also be used as program statements. There is little support for structured programming in GW-BASIC. All IF/THEN/ELSE conditional statements must be written on one line, although WHILE/WEND statements may group multiple lines. Functions can only be defined using the single line DEF FNf(x)=<mathematical function of x> statement (e.g., DEF FNLOG(base,number)=LOG(number)/LOG(base)). The data type of variables can be specified with a character at the end of the variable name: A$ is a string of characters, A% is an integer, etc. Groups of variables can also be set to default types based on the initial letter of their name by use of the DEFINT, DEFSTR, etc., statements. The default type for undeclared variables not identified by such typing statements is single-precision floating-point (32-bit MBF).

GW-BASIC allows use of joystick and light pen input devices. GW-BASIC can read from and write to files and COM ports; it can also do event trapping for ports. Since the cassette tape port interface of the original IBM PC was never implemented on compatibles, cassette operations are not supported. GW-BASIC can play simple music using the PLAY statement, needing a string of notes represented in a music macro language, e.g., PLAY "edcdeeL2edfedL4c". More low-level control is possible with the SOUND statement, which takes the arguments of a frequency in hertz and a length in clock ticks for the standard internal PC speaker in IBM machines. Consequently, sound is limited to single channel beeps and whistles as befits a "business" machine. GW-BASIC for the Tandy 1000 allows up to three channels of sound for the SOUND and PLAY commands.

== Name ==
There are several theories on what the initials "GW" represent. Greg Whitten, an early Microsoft employee who developed the standards in the company's BASIC compiler line, says that Bill Gates picked the name GW-BASIC. Whitten refers to it as Gee-Whiz BASIC and is unsure whether Gates named the program after him. The Microsoft User Manual from Microsoft Press also refers to it by the Gee-Whiz BASIC name. It may have also been nicknamed Gee-Whiz because of its numerous graphics commands. Other common theories as to the initials' origins include "Graphics and Windows", "Gates, William" (Microsoft's president at the time), or "Gates–Whitten" (the two main designers of the program). Gates himself wrote an article commemorating the 25th anniversary of BASIC, in which he says that GW-BASIC is "short for Gee Whiz."

== See also ==
- Microsoft Binary Format (MBF)
