= Nibbles (video game) =

1991 video game

- Publisher: Microsoft
- Programmer: Rick Raddatz
- Platform: MS-DOS
- Release: 1991; 35 years ago
- Genre: Action
- Modes: Single-player, multiplayer

Nibbles, also known by the source code's 8.3 filename NIBBLES.BAS, is a variant of the snake video game concept used to demonstrate the QBasic programming language. Nibbles was written in QBasic by Rick Raddatz, who later went on to create small businesses such as Xiosoft and Bizpad.

== Gameplay ==
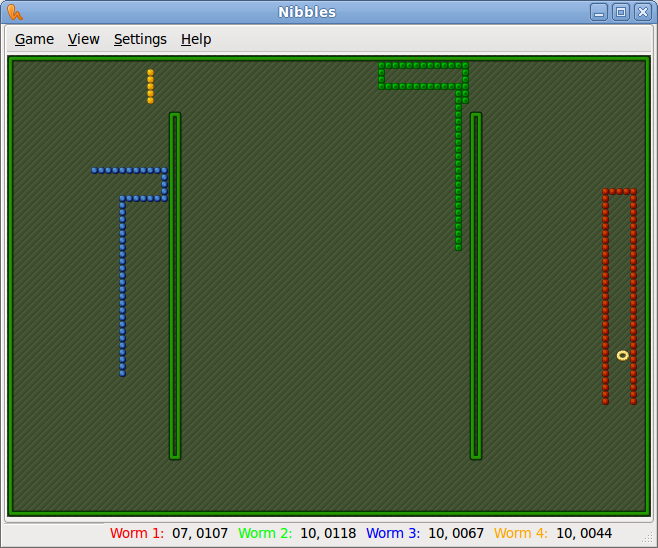
GNOME Nibbles, a clone of QBasic Nibbles

The game's objective is to navigate a virtual snake through a walled space while consuming numbers (from 1 through 9) along the way. The player must avoid colliding with walls, other snakes or their own snake. Since the length of the snake increases with each number consumed, the game becomes more difficult over time. After the last number has been eaten, the player progresses to the next level, with more complex obstacles and increased speed. There is a multiplayer mode which allows a second player to control a second snake by using a different set of keys on the same keyboard.

== Development ==
Nibbles was included with MS-DOS version 5.0 and above. Written in QBasic, it is one of the programs included as a demonstration of that programming language. The QBasic game uses the standard 80x25 text screen to emulate an 80x50 grid by making clever use of foreground and background colors, and the ANSI characters for full blocks and half-height blocks. Microsoft's 24kB QBasic version was copyrighted in 1990. Due to MS-DOS's prevalence at the time, it was available on almost every IBM PC compatible in the early 1990s.

== See also ==
- DONKEY.BAS – 1981 video game
- Gorillas (video game)
