= QuickBASIC =

IDE for the BASIC programming language

- Paradigm: Procedural
- Developer: Microsoft
- First appeared: 1985; 41 years ago
- Stable release: 7.1 / 1990; 36 years ago
- Typing discipline: Static, strong
- OS: MS-DOS, PC DOS, OS/2
- License: Proprietary

Influenced by
- BASCOM, GW-BASIC

Influenced
- FreeBASIC, QB64, QBasic, QuickBASIC Interpreter

Microsoft QuickBASIC (also QB) is an Integrated Development Environment (or IDE) and compiler for the BASIC programming language that was developed by Microsoft. QuickBASIC runs mainly on MS-DOS, though there was also a short-lived version for Classic Mac OS. It is loosely based on GW-BASIC but adds user-defined types, improved programming structures, better graphics and disk support and a compiler in addition to the interpreter. Microsoft marketed QuickBASIC as the introductory level for their BASIC Professional Development System. Microsoft marketed two other similar IDEs for C and Pascal, viz QuickC and QuickPascal.

== History ==
Microsoft released the first version of QuickBASIC on August 18, 1985 on a single 5.25-inch 360 KB floppy disk. QuickBASIC version 2.0 and later contained an Integrated Development Environment (IDE), allowing users to edit directly in its on-screen text editor.

Although still supported in QuickBASIC, line numbers became optional. Program jumps also worked with named labels. Later versions also added control structures, such as multiline conditional statements and loop blocks.

Microsoft's "PC BASIC Compiler" was included for compiling programs into DOS executables. Beginning with version 4.0, the editor included an interpreter that allowed the programmer to run the program without leaving the editor. The interpreter was used to debug a program before creating an executable file. Unfortunately, there were some subtle differences between the interpreter and the compiler, which meant that large programs that ran correctly in the interpreter might fail after compilation, or not compile at all because of differences in the memory management routines.

The last version of QuickBASIC was version 4.5 (1988), although development of the Microsoft BASIC Professional Development System (PDS) continued until its last release of version 7.1 in October 1990. At the same time, the QuickBASIC packaging was silently changed so that the disks used the same compression used for BASIC PDS 7.1. The Basic PDS 7.x version of the IDE was called QuickBASIC Extended (QBX), and it only ran on DOS, unlike the rest of Basic PDS 7.x, which also ran on OS/2.

QuickBASIC 4.5 was the subject of numerous books, articles, and programming tutorials, and arrived near the high-point of BASIC saturation in the PC marketplace. In 1989, Microsoft Press bundled the QuickBASIC Interpreter 1.0 1989 into a book-and-software learning system called Learn BASIC Now. The bundled product was priced at $39.95 and included a Foreword written by Bill Gates, who reported that BASIC was in active use by over four million PC users.

The successor to QuickBASIC and Basic PDS was Visual Basic version 1.0 for MS-DOS, shipped in Standard and Professional versions. Later versions of Visual Basic did not include DOS versions, as Microsoft concentrated on Windows applications.

A subset of QuickBASIC 4.5, named QBasic, was included with MS-DOS 5 and later versions, replacing the GW-BASIC included with previous versions of MS-DOS. Compared to QuickBASIC, QBasic is limited to an interpreter only, lacks a few functions, can only handle programs of a limited size, and lacks support for separate program modules. Since it lacks a compiler, it cannot be used to produce executable files, although its program source code can still be compiled by a QuickBASIC 4.5, PDS 7.x or VBDOS 1.0 compiler, if available.

QuickBASIC 1.00 for the Apple Macintosh operating system was launched in 1988. It was officially supported on machines running System 6 with at least 1 MB of RAM. QuickBASIC could also be run on System 7, as long as 32-bit addressing was disabled. QuickBASIC programming was significantly different on the Macintosh, because the system offered a graphical user interface and an event-driven programming model.

== Syntax example ==
Hello, World, shortest version:

?"Hello, World"

Hello, World, extended version:

CLS
PRINT "Hello, World"
END

99 Bottles of Beer:

LET BOTTLES = 99: LET BOTTLES$ = "99": LET BOTTLE$ = " bottles"
FOR A = 1 TO 99
PRINT BOTTLES$; BOTTLE$; " of beer on the wall, "; BOTTLES$; BOTTLE$; " of beer."
LET BOTTLES = BOTTLES - 1
IF BOTTLES > 0 THEN LET BOTTLES$ = LTRIM$(STR$(BOTTLES)): LET PRONOUN$ = "one"
IF BOTTLES = 0 THEN LET BOTTLES$ = "no more": LET PRONOUN$ = "it"
IF BOTTLES <> 1 THEN LET BOTTLE$ = " bottles"
IF BOTTLES = 1 THEN LET BOTTLE$ = " bottle"
PRINT "Take "; PRONOUN$; " down and pass it around, "; BOTTLES$; BOTTLE$; " of beer on the wall."
PRINT: NEXT A
PRINT "No more bottles of beer on the wall, no more bottles of beer."
PRINT "Go to the store and buy some more, 99 bottles of beer on the wall."

Graphics example:

SCREEN 13
DIM a(3976) AS INTEGER, b(3976) AS INTEGER, c(3976) AS INTEGER
DIM d(3976) AS INTEGER, e(3976) AS INTEGER
col% = 16: col1% = 16: col2% = 16: col3% = 16: col4% = 16
col5% = 16: col6% = 16: col7% = 16: flag = 1: flag1 = 1
flag2 = 1: flag3 = 1:flag4 = 1: flag5 = 1: flag6 = 1: flag7 = 1
DO
    GET (1, 38)-(318, 62), a
    PUT (2, 38), a, PSET
    LINE (1, 38)-(1, 62), col%
    IF flag = 1 THEN col% = col% + 1: IF col% = 32 THEN flag = 2
    IF flag = 2 THEN col% = col% - 1: IF col% = 16 THEN flag = 1
    GET (2, 63)-(319, 87), b
    PUT (1, 63), b, PSET
    LINE (319, 63)-(319, 87), col1%
    IF flag1 = 1 THEN col1% = col1% + 1: IF col1% = 32 THEN flag1 = 2
    IF flag1 = 2 THEN col1% = col1% - 1: IF col1% = 16 THEN flag1 = 1
    GET (1, 88)-(318, 112), c
    PUT (2, 88), c, PSET
    LINE (1, 88)-(1, 112), col2%
    IF flag2 = 1 THEN col2% = col2% + 1: IF col2% = 32 THEN flag2 = 2
    IF flag2 = 2 THEN col2% = col2% - 1: IF col2% = 16 THEN flag2 = 1
    GET (2, 113)-(319, 137), d
    PUT (1, 113), d, PSET
    LINE (319, 113)-(319, 137), col3%
    IF flag3 = 1 THEN col3% = col3% + 1: IF col3% = 32 THEN flag3 = 2
    IF flag3 = 2 THEN col3% = col3% - 1: IF col3% = 16 THEN flag3 = 1
    GET (1, 138)-(318, 162), e
    PUT (2, 138), e, PSET
    LINE (1, 138)-(1, 162), col4%
    IF flag4 = 1 THEN col4% = col4% + 1: IF col4% = 32 THEN flag4 = 2
    IF flag4 = 2 THEN col4% = col4% - 1: IF col4% = 16 THEN flag4 = 1
LOOP UNTIL LEN(INKEY$)

Bubble sort:

REM sample of bubble sort
N = 10
DIM A(1 TO N) AS INTEGER
FOR L = 1 TO N
    A(L) = INT(RND * 10 + 1)
NEXT
FOR X = 1 TO N - 1
    FOR Y = X + 1 TO N
        IF A(X) < A(Y) THEN SWAP A(X), A(Y)
    NEXT
NEXT
FOR L = 1 TO N
    PRINT A(L)
NEXT
END

== Current uses ==
QuickBASIC has a community of hobby programmers who use the compiler to write video games, GUIs and utilities. The community has several Web sites, message boards and online magazines.

Today, programmers sometimes use DOS emulators, such as DOSBox, to run QuickBASIC on Linux and on modern personal computers that no longer support the compiler. Alternatives to this include FreeBASIC and QB64, but they cannot yet run all QBasic/QuickBASIC programs.

Since 2008, a set of TCP/IP routines for QuickBASIC 4.x and 7.1 has revitalized some interest in the software. In particular, the vintage computer hobbyist community has been able to write software for old computers that run DOS, allowing these machines to access other computers through a LAN or the internet. This has allowed systems even as old as an 8088 to serve new functions, such as acting as a Web server or using IRC.

== Successors ==
Microsoft's Visual Basic was the successor of QuickBASIC. Other compilers, like PowerBASIC and FreeBASIC, have varying degrees of compatibility. QB64, a multiplatform QuickBASIC to C++ translator, retains close to 100% compatibility and compiles natively for Windows, Linux and macOS.

=== QuickBASIC Interpreters ===
Microsoft Press published Learn BASIC Now in 1989, and included the Microsoft QuickBASIC Interpreter 1.0 1989 (QBI.exe) which was a direct derivative interpreter-only of QuickBASIC 4.5 1988 (QB.exe). Microsoft QBasic interpreter, included with MS-DOS 5.0 and onward, was a derivative of QBI 1.0, hence a derivative of QuickBASIC 4.5.

==== QuickBASIC Interpreter Family Pedigree ====
QBasic 1.0 1991 ← QuickBASIC Interpreter 1.0 1989 ← QuickBASIC 4.5 1988

== See also ==
- QuickBASIC Interpreter
- QBasic
- QB64
- FreeBasic
- Turbo Basic
