= QBasic =

IDE for the BASIC programming language

- Paradigm: Procedural
- Developer: Microsoft
- First appeared: 1991; 35 years ago
- Stable release: 1.1 / 1993; 33 years ago
- Typing discipline: Static, strong
- OS: MS-DOS, Windows 95, Windows 98, Windows Me, PC DOS, OS/2, eComStation, ArcaOS
- License: Proprietary

Influenced by
- QuickBASIC Interpreter, QuickBASIC, GW-BASIC

Influenced
- FreeBASIC, QB64, SmallBasic

QBasic is an integrated development environment (IDE) and interpreter for a variety of dialects of BASIC which are based on the QuickBASIC compiler and the QuickBASIC Interpreter. Code entered into the IDE is an intermediate representation (IR), and this IR is immediately executed on demand within the IDE.

Like QuickBASIC, but unlike the earlier versions of MBASIC and GWBASIC, QBasic is a structured programming language, supporting constructs such as subroutines. Line numbers, a concept often associated with BASIC, are supported for compatibility but are not considered good form, having been replaced by descriptive line labels. QBasic has limited support for user-defined data types (structures), and several primitive types used to contain strings of text or numeric data. It supports various inbuilt functions.

For its time, QBasic provided a state-of-the-art IDE, including a debugger with features such as on-the-fly expression evaluation and modifications in code

== History ==
QBasic 2000-1991, was intended as a replacement for GWBASIC 1989-1983. QBasic was a subset of the ever popular QuickBASIC 4.5 1988 $99 compiler, targeted for the hobbyists and home users; QuickBASIC 4.5 in turn was a subset of the BASIC Professional Development System 7.1 1990 $495.

=== QBasic Ancestry ===
In 1988, soon after the release of QuickBASIC 4.5, Microsoft Press published Learn BASIC Now in 1989 $39.95 and included the QuickBASIC Interpreter 1.0 1989. QBI.exe was based on QuickBASIC 4.5's QB.exe but without the ability to create executable files on disk; lacked handling interrupts, signals, sleep, events; limited the user's program + data to 160K only; included the QuickBASIC Advisor (three help files); as well as the QB Express—Computer Based Training (LEARN).

QuickBASIC Interpreter 1.0 1989 became the basis for the QBasic interpreter 1.0 1991—both supported the same IDE menus, the same language syntax, and the same execution limits. However, QBasic had a condensed Advisor (single help file) only and lacked the QB Express (LEARN).

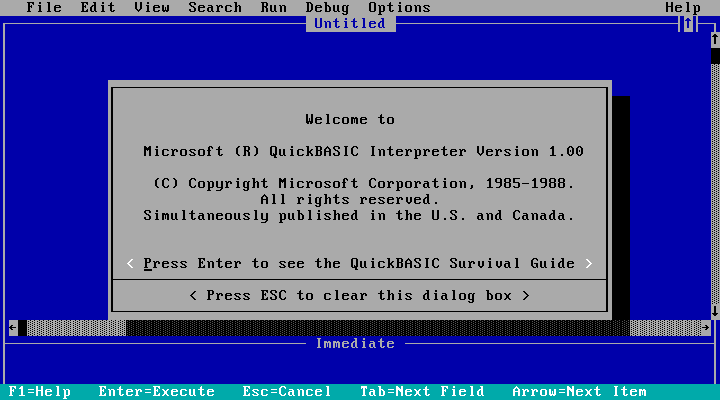
QuickBASIC Interpreter 1.0 Opening Screen

=== QBasic Family Pedigree ===
QBasic 1.0 1991 ← QuickBASIC Interpreter 1.0 1989 ← QuickBASIC 4.5 1988

=== QBasic Versions ===
QBasic version 1.0 was shipped together with MS-DOS 5.0x, as well as Windows NT 3.x, and Windows NT 4.0. IBM recompiled QBasic and included it in PC DOS 5.x, as well as OS/2 2.0 onwards. eComStation and ArcaOS, descendants of the OS/2 source code, also included QBasic 1.0.

QBasic 1.1 was included with MS-DOS 6.x, and, without EDIT, in Windows 95, Windows 98 and Windows Me. Starting with Windows 2000, Microsoft no longer included QBasic or any BASIC with their operating systems.

== Contents ==
QBasic (as well as the built-in MS-DOS Editor) is backward-compatible with DOS releases prior to 5.0 (down to at least DOS 3.20). However, if used on any 8088/8086 computers, or on some 80286 computers, the QBasic program may run very slowly, or perhaps not at all, due to DOS memory size limits. Until MS-DOS 7, MS-DOS Editor and Help required QBasic: the EDIT.COM and HELP.COM programs simply started QBasic in editor-and-help mode only, and these can also be entered by running QBASIC.EXE with the /EDITOR and /QHELP switches (i.e., command lines QBASIC /EDITOR and QBASIC /QHELP).

QBasic came complete with four pre-written example programs. These were Nibbles, a variant of the Snake game; Gorillas, an artillery game; MONEY MANAGER, a personal finance manager; and RemLine, a Q-BASIC code line-number-removing program.

QBasic has an Easter egg accessed by pressing and holding Left CTRL+Left SHIFT+Left ALT+Right CTRL+Right SHIFT+Right ALT simultaneously after running QBasic at the DOS prompt but before the title screen loads: this lists The Team of programmers.

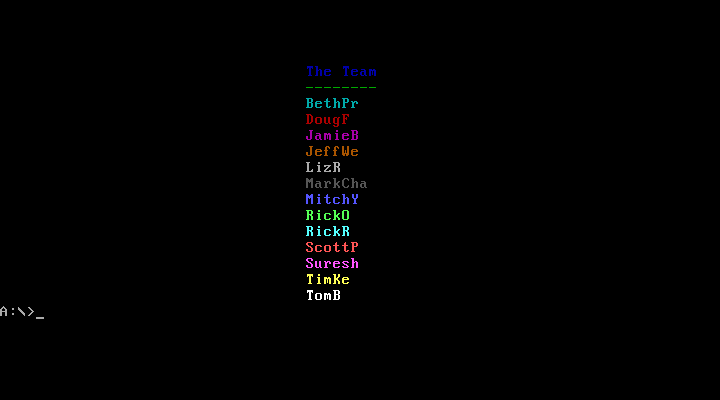
QBasic 1.0 and 1.1 Easter Egg - The Team

== See also ==
- Learn BASIC Now – 1989 computer programming book
- QB64 – IDE for the BASIC programming language
- FreeBasic – BASIC dialect
- Microsoft Small Basic – Programming language dialect and development environment
