= Microsoft Press =

Book publishing company

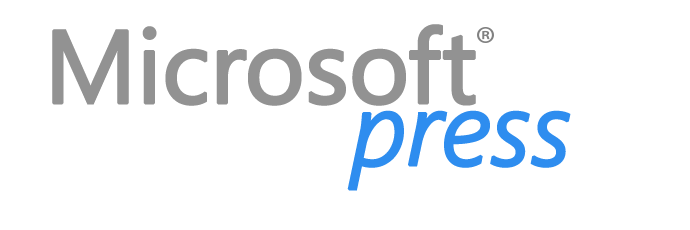
- Parent company: Microsoft
- Country of origin: United States
- Distribution: Pearson plc
- Publication types: Books
- Nonfiction topics: Technology
- Official website: microsoftpressstore.com

Microsoft Press is the publishing division of Microsoft, producing books related to Microsoft technologies. Its early publications included The Apple Macintosh Book by Cary Lu and Exploring the IBM PCjr Home Computer by Peter Norton, published in 1984 at the West Coast Computer Faire. Over time, the publisher has released books authored by notable figures such as Charles Petzold, Steve McConnell, Mark Russinovich, and Jeffrey Richter.

In 2009, a distribution agreement was made with O'Reilly Media, which became the official distributor of Microsoft Press publications. This arrangement changed in 2014 when Pearson assumed distribution responsibilities.

== History and role ==
Of the dozen books that have sprung up to explain Microsoft Word, two are published by Microsoft itself and another has been announced from the same source. If you raise an eyebrow over a publishing firm that first issues an inadequate manual for one of its programs, then suggests that you buy two or three of their books to make up for the deficiency, you are not alone.

— Edward Mendelson in The Yale Review, 1986

Microsoft Press has been involved in the provision of educational materials for developers, IT professionals, and students who are interested in Microsoft technology. In the 1990s and early 2000s, Microsoft Press published a number of books that facilitated the adoption and understanding of Microsoft products such as Windows and Office. These books have been used as reference guides and training materials in the technology sector.

In recent years, the publishing environment has changed to focus on digital media and online resources. However, Microsoft Press has continued to publish books in areas such as cloud computing, artificial intelligence, and cybersecurity. The shift in the distribution of books to outside publishers such as Pearson is a reflection of the changes that are taking place in the publishing sector. The layoff of Microsoft Press employees in 2016 indicated a shift away from in-house publishing and towards outside authors and publishers.
