= Atari 8-bit computer software =

Atari's packaging style from the 400/800 era

Many games, utilities, and educational programs were available for Atari 8-bit computers. Atari, Inc. was primarily the publisher following the launch of the Atari 400/800 in 1979, then increasingly by third parties. Atari also distributed "user written" software through the Atari Program Exchange from 1981 to 1984. After APX folded, many titles were picked up by Antic Software.

== Programming languages ==
=== Assembly language ===
Atari, Inc. published two assemblers. The Atari Assembler Editor cartridge is a friendlier, integrated development environment using line numbers for editing source code similar to Atari BASIC. The professionally targeted Atari Macro Assembler shipped at a higher price on a copy protected disk with a full-screen editor but no debugger. Third-party assemblers include SynAssembler from Synapse Software and MAE (Macro Assembler Editor) from Eastern House.

Optimized Systems Software published an enhanced disk-based assembler mimicking the structure of Atari's Assembler Editor as EASMD (Editor/Assembler/Debug). It followed that with MAC/65 first on disk with BUG/65 as a companion product, then as a 16KB bank-switched cartridge. MAC/65 tokenizes lines of code as they are entered and has much faster assembly times than Atari's products.

Dunion's Debugging Tool (or DDT) by Jim Dunion is a machine language debugger originally sold through the Atari Program Exchange. A reduced version is included in the cartridge version of MAC/65. Atari magazine ANALOG Computing published the machine language monitor H:BUG as a type-in listing, followed by BBK Monitor.

=== BASIC ===
Atari shipped Atari BASIC with all their machines either as a cartridge or in ROM. It also sold Atari Microsoft BASIC on disk and later on cartridge. Optimized Systems Software created a series of enhanced BASIC interpreters: BASIC A+, BASIC XL, BASIC XE. Commercial BASIC compilers for Atari BASIC were available: ABC (Monarch Data Systems, 1982), MMG BASIC Compiler (1984), Advan BASIC (1985). The freeware Turbo-BASIC XL compiler, released in 1985, was popular in the later years of the Atari 8-bit line.

In 1984, ANALOG Computing published Minicomp, a compiler that generates machine code from a minimalist subset of Atari BASIC statements.

=== Pascal ===
Atari's own Atari Pascal requires two disk drives and was relegated to the Atari Program Exchange instead of the official product line. Later options were Draper Pascal (1983), Kyan Pascal (1986), and CLSN Pascal (1989).

=== Forth ===
Atari 8-bit Forths include fig-Forth, Extended fig-Forth (Atari Program Exchange), ES-Forth, QS Forth, and ValFORTH. The animated in-store demo to promote the 400/800 line was written with Atari's internal "Coin-Op Forth" implementation.

=== Other ===
Action! is an ALGOL 68-like procedural programming language on cartridge with an integrated compiler and full-screen text editor. The language is designed for quick compile times and to generate efficient 6502 machine code.

Deep Blue C is a port of Ron Cain's Small-C compiler. It was sold through the Atari Program Exchange.

Atari, Inc. published the highly regarded Atari Logo as well as Atari PILOT, both on cartridge.

Other Atari 8-bit languages include Extended WSFN and Inter-LISP/65.

== Applications ==
See Category:Atari 8-bit computer software.

=== Word processors ===
Atari, Inc. published the Atari Word Processor in 1981, followed by the more popular AtariWriter cartridge in 1983. Third party options include PaperClip, Letter Perfect, Word Magic, Superscript, Bank Street Writer, COMPUTE! magazine's type-in SpeedScript, The Writer's Tool cartridge from OSS, Muse Software's Super-Text, KISS, Wordman, and relative latecomer The First XLEnt Word Processor in 1986. Cut & Paste from Electronic Arts and Homeword from Sierra On-Line were designed to be simpler to use than other programs. Antic compared seven word processors in the February 1987 issue of the magazine.

Two integrated software packages that include word processing are HomePak and Mini Office II.

=== Graphics ===
Video Easel is an art generation and drawing program released on cartridge by Atari, Inc. in 1980. Graphics Magician (1984), from Penguin Software, is a bitmap drawing program which was used to create images for commercial graphic adventures. Other graphics editors are Drawit (Atari Program Exchange, 1983) and RAMbrandt (Antic Software, 1985).

Movie Maker, originally from Reston Publishing then later Electronic Arts, allows creating full-screen animations with synchronized audio that can be saved in a standalone playback format. Cartoonist (Atari Program Exchange, 1983), by Bryan Talbot, is designed for drawing animated sequences.

=== Music ===
Atari's Music Composer cartridge (1979), the first music composition software for the Atari 8-bit computers, was later joined by Advanced MusicSystem from the Atari Program Exchange (1982), Music Construction Set (1983), and Bank Street Music Writer (1985). Antic published the Antic Music Processor in 1988 as a disk bonus.

== Games ==
Because of graphics superior to that of the Apple II and Atari's home-oriented marketing, the Atari 8-bit computers gained a good reputation for games. BYTE in 1981 stated that "for sound and video graphics [they] are hard to beat". Jerry Pournelle wrote in the magazine in 1982, when trying to decide what computer to buy his sons, that "if you're only interested in games, that's the machine to get. It's not all that expensive, either". A 1984 compendium of reviews used 198 pages for games compared to 167 for all other software. It noted the existence of a distinct "graphics look" to native Atari software: "Multiple graphics modes, four directional fine scrolling, colorful modified character-set backgrounds, and, of course, player missile graphics".

Star Raiders was Atari's killer app, akin to VisiCalc for the Apple II in its ability to persuade customers to buy the computer. Antic in 1986 stated that "it was the first program that showed all of the Atari computer's audio and visual capabilities. It was just a game, yes, but it revolutionized the idea of what a personal computer could be made to do." When Electronic Arts started publishing games in 1983, the Atari 8-bit line was a key platform. EA's M.U.L.E takes advantage of the four joystick ports on the original Atari 400/800 models, as does the cooperative dungeon crawl Dandy. Dandy was the direct inspiration for the 1985 Gauntlet arcade game, which also allows four players.
