= List of disk operating systems called DOS =

This is a list of disk operating systems with the acronym DOS as part of the name (e.g., TRSDOS for the TRS-80 line of computers). Many are (or were in the day) called simply DOS within the context of their respective user communities. In the case of MS-DOS, its ubiquitousness as the operating system for IBM PC compatibles, prior to Windows 95, caused DOS to be widely used as a synonym for MS-DOS.

== For IBM PC compatible systems ==
In chronological order of release:

- IBM PC DOS (1981), operating system developed by Microsoft based on 86-DOS
- MS-DOS, Microsoft's rebranded version sold under its own name. MS-DOS and IBM PC DOS were almost identical until PC DOS version 6.
- DR-DOS (1988), MS-DOS-compatible operating system originally developed by Digital Research
- ROM-DOS (1989), MS-DOS clone by Datalight
- PTS-DOS (1993), MS-DOS clone developed in Russia by PhysTechSoft
- FreeDOS (1994), open source MS-DOS clone
- MiniVMDOS (2025), MS-DOS, PC-DOS, DR-DOS compatible system developed by PTSource
- LiberDOS (2026), MS-DOS compatible system developed by LiberSoft

== For other x86 systems ==
In alphabetical order:

- 86-DOS (a.k.a. QDOS, created 1980), an operating system developed by Seattle Computer Products for its 8086-based S-100 computer kit, heavily inspired by CP/M
- Concurrent DOS (a.k.a. CDOS, Concurrent PC DOS and CPCDOS) (since 1983), a CP/M-86 and MS-DOS 2.11 compatible multiuser, multitasking DOS, based on Concurrent CP/M-86 developed by Digital Research
- DOS Plus (since 1985), a PC DOS and CP/M-86 compatible multitasking operating system for early x86-based personal computers, based on Concurrent PC DOS 4.1/5.0 by Digital Research
- Multiuser DOS (a.k.a. MDOS), a PC DOS and CP/M-86 compatible multiuser multitasking operating system based on Concurrent DOS by Digital Research
- NetWare PalmDOS, a successor of DR DOS 6.0 specifically tailored for early mobile and palmtop PCs by Novell
- Novell DOS, a multitasking successor of DR DOS 6.0 by Novell
- OpenDOS, a successor of Novell DOS by Caldera

== For Atari 8-bit computers ==
In alphabetical order:

- Atari DOS, from Atari, Inc.
- DOS XL, from Optimized Systems Software
- MyDOS
- SmartDOS
- SpartaDOS
- SpartaDOS X
- TOP-DOS
- Turbo-DOS

== For other platforms ==
In alphabetical order:

- AmigaDOS, disk operating system portion of AmigaOS
- AMSDOS, for Amstrad CPC compatibles
- ANDOS, for the Russian Electronika BK
- Apple DOS, for the Apple II series from late 1978 through early 1983
- Apple ProDOS, name for both ProDOS 8 for the Apple II and ProDOS 16 for the Apple IIGS
- Commodore DOS, for Commodore's 8-bit computers
- Cromemco DOS (CDOS), a CP/M-like operating system
- CSI-DOS, for the Soviet Elektronika BK computers
- DOS (Diskette Operating System), a small OS for 16-bit Data General Nova computers, a cut-down version of their RDOS.
- DEC BATCH-11/DOS-11, the first operating system to run on the PDP-11 minicomputer
- Delta DOS, third party option from Premier Microsystems for the Dragon 32/64
- DIP DOS, the operating system of the Atari Portfolio
- DOS/360, 1966 IBM System/360 mainframe computer Disk Operating System
- DragonDOS, for the Dragon 32/64
- GEMDOS, one of the components of Atari TOS
- HDOS, for Heathkit computers
- IDOS, for the Ivel Ultra Apple II clone
- IS-DOS, for Russian ZX Spectrum clones, developed in 1990 or 1991
- IMDOS, for IMSAI 8080
- MasterDOS, replacement DOS for the SAM Coupé
- MDOS (Micropolis DOS) for S-100
- MDOS, Myarc Disk Operating System for the Geneve 9640
- MSX-DOS, a cross between MS-DOS 1.0 and CP/M developed by Microsoft for the MSX computer standard
- NewDos/80, third-party option for the TRS-80
- Oric DOS, for the Oric-1
- PTDOS, for the 1970s Sol-20 from Processor Technology
- QDOS, for the Sinclair QL
- SAMDOS, for the SAM Coupé
- SDOS, for the SWTPC 6800
- RDOS, for the Data General Nova and Eclipse minicomputers
- SK*DOS, for Motorola 68000-based systems
- TR-DOS, for the ZX Spectrum
- TRSDOS, for the TRS-80
- Xtal DOS for the Tatung Einstein

== See also ==
- DOS (disambiguation)
