= DOS 3 =

DOS 3 or DOS-3 may refer to:

- Kosmos 557 aka Salyut-3 or DOS-3, a Russian space station
- Apple DOS for the Apple II, released in versions 3.1, 3.2, and 3.3
- Atari DOS 3 for Atari 8-bit computers

It may also refer to versions of the Microsoft MS-DOS family:

- MS-DOS 3.0, with FAT16 support in 1984
- MS-DOS 3.1 in 1985
- MS-DOS 3.2 in 1985
- MS-DOS 3.21 in 1987
  - MS-DOS 3.21R, a ROMed version of MS-DOS in 1989 for laptops
- MS-DOS 3.22, a ROMed OEM version of MS-DOS for HP 95LX in 1991
- MS-DOS 3.3 in 1987
- MS-DOS 3.3A
  - Arabic MS-DOS 3.3, a special Arabic version of MS-DOS 3.3 (ADOS) in 1988
  - Hebrew MS-DOS 3.3, a special Hebrew version of MS-DOS 3.3 (HDOS)
  - MS-DOS 3.3R, a ROMed version of MS-DOS in 1990 for TI laptops
- MS-DOS 3.31, an OEM version of MS-DOS with FAT16B support by Compaq
- MS-DOS 3.30+, an OEM version of MS-DOS with FAT16B support by Zenith-Data System
- MS-DOS 3.40, announced OEM version and successor of MS-DOS 3.3 with FAT16B support in 1988

It may also refer to versions of the IBM PC DOS family:

- PC DOS 3.0, successor of PC DOS 2.11 with FAT16 support in 1984
- PC DOS 3.1, successor of PC DOS 3.0 in 1984/1985
- PC DOS 3.2, successor of PC DOS 3.1 in 1986
- PC DOS 3.21, successor of PC DOS 3.2 in 1986
- IBM DOS 3.3, successor of PC DOS 3.21 in 1987
- IBM DOS 3.4, announced successor of IBM DOS 3.3 in 1988

It may also refer to versions of the Digital Research DR DOS family:

- DR DOS 3.31, based on DOS Plus 2.1 and Concurrent PC DOS 6.0 with FAT16B support in 1988
- DR DOS 3.32, successor of DR DOS 3.31 in 1988, reporting itself as "PC DOS 3.31"
- DR DOS 3.33, successor of DR DOS 3.32 in 1988, reporting itself as "PC DOS 3.31"
- DR DOS 3.34, successor of DR DOS 3.33 in 1988, reporting itself as "PC DOS 3.31"
- DR DOS 3.35, successor of DR DOS 3.34 in 1988, reporting itself as "PC DOS 3.31"
- DR DOS 3.40, successor of DR DOS 3.35, reporting itself as "PC DOS 3.31"
- DR DOS 3.41, successor of DR DOS 3.40 in 1989, reporting itself as "PC DOS 3.31"
- DR DOS 5.0, successor of DR DOS 3.41 in 1990, reporting itself as "PC DOS 3.31"
- DR DOS 6.0, successor of DR DOS 5.0 in 1991, reporting itself as "PC DOS 3.31"
- NetWare PalmDOS 1.0, a successor to DR DOS 6.0 tailored for early palmtop PCs in 1992, reporting itself as "PC DOS 3.31"

== See also ==
- Microsoft Windows NTDOS 30.00
- DOS (disambiguation)
- DOS 2 (disambiguation)
- DOS 4 (disambiguation)
- DOS/360
- DOS 386 (disambiguation)
