= SpartaDOS X =

Disk operating system

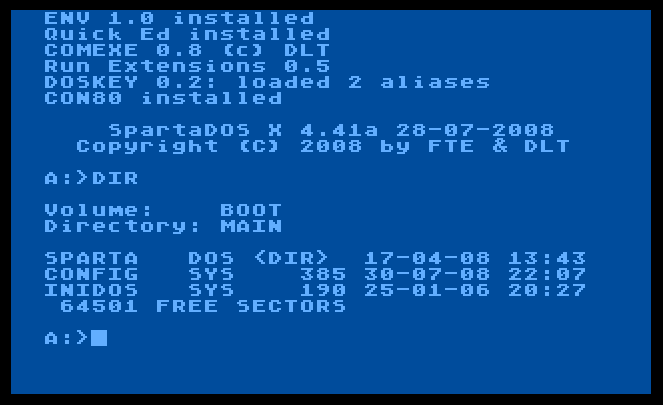
- Command prompt (4.42-beta)
- Developer: ICD, Inc. (4.0-4.21); Fine Tooned Engineering (4.22); DLT (since 4.31)
- Written in: 6502 assembler
- OS family: SpartaDOS X
- Working state: Current
- Source model: Closed source
- Initial release: 1988; 38 years ago
- Latest release: 4.51 / September 25, 2026; 53 days ago
- Latest preview: 4.49g / January 9, 2022; 4 years ago
- Available in: English
- Supported platforms: Atari 8-bit
- Influenced by: MS-DOS
- Default user interface: Command-line interface
- License: Proprietary
- Official website: spartados.com

SpartaDOS X (or SpartaDOS 4.0) is a disk operating system for the Atari 8-bit computers that closely resembles MS-DOS. It was developed and sold by ICD in 1987–1993, and many years later picked up by the third-party community SpartaDOS X Upgrade Project, which still maintains the software.

== History ==
SpartaDOS X is a successor to SpartaDOS 1.0, 2.0 and 3.0 (also ICD products). SpartaDOS X 4.0 was originally developed by Michael Gustafson in 1987–89, and shipped on 64k ROM cartridges by ICD, Inc. up to version 4.21. The cartridge contained an additional cartridge slot on itself, so that it was possible to plug in another cartridge, such as ICD's R-Time 8 battery-backed clock, a language cartridge (Action!, MAC/65 etc.) or a game cartridge, and use it in conjunction with the DOS.

In 1992, Atari Corporation dropped all the official support for the Atari 8-bit computers, and so did ICD shortly after that. The rights for the 8-bit ICD inventory were purchased in November 1993 by Michael Hohman, officially as Fine Tooned Engineering. FTE released a slightly updated version 4.22 on 5 November 1995, and, after two or three years, disappeared together with all the items and rights it owned.

Ten years later development of SpartaDOS X was picked up by its enthusiasts, as SpartaDOS X Upgrade Project. It resulted in several unofficial revisions of the software, incorporating many of the utilities written since 1992, cleaning many identified problems and including numerous improvements. As of 2024 the published versions are:

- 4.31 (2005)
- 4.39RC (2006)
- 4.40 (a leaked-out beta, 2006)
- 4.41 (Feb. 2008)
- 4.42 (Dec. 2008)
- 4.43 (Apr. 2011)
- 4.44 (Jun. 2011)
- 4.45 (Nov. 2011)
- 4.46 (Jan. 2013)
- 4.47 (Feb. 2015)
- 4.48 (Jul. 2016)
- 4.49 (Apr. 2020)
- 4.50 (Dec. 2024)
- 4.51 (Sep. 2026)

== Characteristics ==
=== General ===
SpartaDOS X is a non-multitasking operating system intentionally modeled after and closely resembling MS-DOS in look and feel. It consists of the kernel, the system library, several types of drivers, the shell (called COMMAND.COM) and a number of utility programs. SpartaDOS X is written in 6502 machine language and fits into a 128k file-oriented ROM cartridge.

=== Supported storage devices ===
SpartaDOS X disk editor utility

There is full support for Atari-type serial disk drives as well as for parallel hard drives, as long as they conform to Atari standards (i.e. as long as they use the "plug-and-play" Parallel Bus Interface (PBI) mechanism implemented in the ROM OS of the XL/XE computers). For those which do not, and for ramdisks and the like, up to four block-device drivers can be installed. Nonstandard hard disk interfaces are handled by specialized drivers.

The maximum number of drives (or hard disk partitions) connected at the same time is 15 as of version 4.40 (9 in earlier versions).

=== Kernel built-in functions ===
The kernel allows to open files and directories in read-only, write-only, write-append and read-write modes. It also maintains environment variables, and programs may request files to be searched through directories specified in $PATH. The variables also control some settings for the DOS as well as for programs, for example the format of date and time to be displayed (the choice is between the "European" DD-MM-YY and 24-hour clock, and "American" MM-DD-YY and 12-hour clock).

=== The file system drivers ===
Thanks to some form of virtual filesystem, practically any filesystem can be directly accessed, if an appropriate filesystem driver exists and was loaded to the memory. Up to eight such drivers can be installed at a time.

The main filesystem driver (fitting within less than 4.5 KB) can search directories (FFIRST/FNEXT), read/write files (FREAD/FWRITE), retrieve or change the current position within a file (FTELL/FSEEK), retrieve the file's length (FILELENG), delete files and directories (REMOVE/RMDIR), rename files and directories (RENAME/RENDIR), make directories (MKDIR), change attributes in files and directories (CHMOD), change current directory (CHDIR), retrieve path to current directory (GETCWD), collect information about the disk (GETDFREE), and make a binary file bootable (SETBOOT). It also maintains the queued buffer cache that can hold up to 16 sectors (8 KB) at a time.

=== The SpartaDOS file system ===
SpartaDOS X 64-column text mode

The proprietary file system format, called SpartaDOS FS (unrelated to and not compatible with MS-DOS FAT), offers full support for subdirectories, MS-DOS-like attributes (AHPS: Archived, Hidden, Protected, Subdirectory), modification date and time stamps, random access to data within a file, sparse files.

The optional support for symbolic links has been added as of SpartaDOS X version 4.50: the required system extension (SYMLINK.SYS) is available as a part of the collection of additional programs (called "SpartaDOS X Toolkit") which is distributed along with the system itself.

The file naming convention is upper-case only 8+3 (this scheme, inherited from CP/M, is normal on Atari). The directory structure is hierarchical, there are no other than practical limits in nesting directories. A directory can contain up to 1423 entries of files and other directories. Directory separators as MSDOS-style '\' characters or native '>' characters, so pathnames look like: D1:\SUBDIR\FILENAME.EXT or D1:>SUBDIR>FILENAME.EXT. MSDOS-stype '..' or native '<' refers to the parent directory. CHDIR with no parameter - the equivalent of PWD - always displays the current directory with '\' characters.

The file system is 16-bit: a drive can contain up to 65,535 logical sectors (sector 0 does not exist on Atari disks). The logical sector size is 128 or 256 bytes in earlier versions, and 128, 256 and 512 bytes as of v. 4.40. This makes a maximum capacity of 16 MB per partition in earlier versions, and 32 MB as of v.4.40. A 4 GB per disk – by making sector clusters, up to 65,536 bytes per cluster – is theoretically possible, but not yet implemented.

=== The DOS library ===
The system library contains a binary loader supporting standard, address-dependent Atari binaries as well as SpartaDOS X address-independent ("relocatable") binary files. It also facilitates such tasks as error handling, parsing the command line, as well as managing memory, file and device resources etc. The library also contains a menu-driven disk formatter, that can be invoked at any time, not only from the DOS' Command Processor, but also from within an application program.

The entire library occupies 24 KB of the cartridge (in three banks, 8 KB each) and can be switched off as necessary to release some memory.

=== COMMAND.COM ===
The SpartaDOS X default user interface is a command-line interpreter with the same name as the one used by MS-DOS: COMMAND.COM. The SpartaDOS X COMMAND.COM program is less than 4 KB and includes roughly 45 internal commands such as DIR, CD, DEL etc. I/O redirection uses "<<" and ">>" instead of "<" and ">" of UNIX and other systems (this is because the ">" sign is the SpartaDOS native path separator).

Pseudo-pipelines are available as of SpartaDOS X version 4.42.

Batch files can contain structured conditionals such as IF ... ELSE ... FI, GOTO, GOSUB, procedures, and loops.

The environment variable $COMSPEC may point to an alternative command-line interpreter, to be loaded instead of COMMAND.COM.

=== Commands, utility programs and optional extensions ===
SpartaDOS X Menu utility

Additional utility, called RUNEXT, allows to associate data types with programs to be invoked automatically, when the user enters the name of the data file at the DOS prompt and hits the Return key.

A program called MENU facilitates complex file management tasks and can serve as a replacement shell. Other utilities allow to change disk names, search disks for files, undelete them, install keyboard buffer, edit system files (CONFIG.SYS and AUTOEXEC.BAT) and so on. A port of ARC provides file compression facilities.

Another file manager, called Sparta Commander, resembling Norton Commander, is available as a part of the additional collection of programs, or SpartaDOS X Toolkit, bundled with the system itself.

Among the dedicated programs, which are not directly available on the cartridge and thus are not bundled with DOS itself, there are disk editors available as well as utilities to check and repair filesystem consistency.

The following commands are supported by SpartaDOS X.

- APPEND
- ARC
- ATR
- ATTRIB
- BASIC
- BLOAD
- BOOT
- CAR
- CD
- CHDIR
- CHKDSK
- CHTD
- CHVOL
- CLR
- CLS
- COLD
- COMMAND
- COMP
- CON
- COPY
- CREDIR
- CWD
- DATE
- DEL
- DELDIR
- DELETE
- DELTREE
- DEV
- DF
- DIR
- DIRS
- DUMP
- ECHO
- ED
- ERASE
- FIND
- FMT
- FORMAT
- KEY
- LESS
- LOAD
- MAN
- MAP
- MD
- MDUMP
- MEM
- MENU
- MKDIR
- MORE
- PATH
- PAUSE
- PEEK
- POKE
- PROMPT
- PWD
- RD
- REN
- RENAME
- RENDIR
- RMDIR
- RS232
- SAVE
- SET
- SETPATHS
- SIOSET
- SORTDIR
- SWAP
- TD
- TIME
- TYPE
- UNERASE
- VER
- VERIFY
- X

== Configuration ==
At startup, a text file called CONFIG.SYS is read from the boot disk. The contents of the file decides, which memory the DOS will use to keep the bulk of its code and drivers (the choice is between the extended memory and two areas of the conventional 64K), how many files can be opened at a time, the size of the buffer cache and its location in the memory (same choices as for the DOS code), the default environment variables, and which drivers to load.

Apart from the "main" one, there can be up to 9 alternative configuration files (or 19 as of v.4.45). The choice between them is offered at startup in a form of a menu. When no CONFIG.SYS file is present, the default one is loaded from the cartridge.

The other default file that can be used for configuration is AUTOEXEC.BAT. It is a batch file that is run by the COMMAND.COM, when the COMMAND.COM is loaded for the first time.

== Requirements ==
SpartaDOS X requires an Atari 8-bit (400, 800 or XL/XE models) computer equipped with at least 48 KB of conventional memory to run, or 64 KB to be truly usable (on a 48K machine there is too little memory left as to execute most programs). The recommended configuration, though, is at least 128 KB of RAM (64k conventional plus at least 64k extended). The DOS can use the extended memory to keep large portion of its code, buffer cache and internal structures thus releasing the conventional memory. The rest of the extended memory can be used for additional drivers or ramdisks.

== Relation to other DOS-es for Atari ==
Unlike its predecessor, SpartaDOS 3.0, SpartaDOS X is not what is commonly referred to as a "DOS" in Atari 8-bit parlance.

The Atari 8-bit Operating System consists of two main parts: the ROM-based "OS" and bootable "DOS". The common misconception about that division is that these respective parts correspond to BIOS and DOS on an IBM PC compatible machine. In reality the "OS" is responsible for communication not only with the block devices (like PC BIOS), but also for character devices, including file-oriented ones (like MS-DOS). Consequently, all the file management functions are centralized in the "OS"-part, and the "DOS"-part is only one of its subordinated device drivers, that performs on a mass-storage media (like floppy disk).

A "DOS" for Atari, then, typically consists of the aforementioned device driver (called FMS, "File Management System"), and an application program playing the role of the OS shell. This shell is typically called DUP, "Disk Utility Package". All the communication between the user programs (including the DUP) and FMS goes through the CIO ("Central Input/Output") residing in ROM.

Such a design has some shortcomings, for example, no typical DOS is able to keep more than eight files opened at a time, because this is the limit imposed by the API of the ROM-based "OS".

Now SpartaDOS X, even though it is registered in the ROM-based CIO as a device driver and (for backward compatibility) performs all typical DOS functions as requested that way, is in fact independent of the CIO. Instead, it has own "I/O centre" (known as "the kernel"), not related to the ROM-based OS, with own set of specifiers and drivers for both character devices (like CON: or COM:) and block devices.

Under SpartaDOS X programs can perform all the I/O operations through the SpartaDOS kernel bypassing the Atari OS in ROM completely. Thanks to that it was possible to break many of its limitations: e.g. there can be as many as 16 files opened at a time. This also makes SpartaDOS X (unlike, for example, its predecessor SpartaDOS 3.2, or any other DOS for Atari) an operating system, not just another device driver with some sort of a shell.
