= DOS 10 =

DOS 10 may refer to OS/2 versions:

- OS/2 1.0, "DOS" version 10.00 by Microsoft and IBM
- OS/2 1.1, "DOS" version 10.10 by Microsoft and IBM
- OS/2 1.2, "DOS" version 10.20 by Microsoft and IBM
- OS/2 1.3, "DOS" version 10.30 by IBM

== See also ==
- DOS (disambiguation)
- DOS 1 (disambiguation)
- DOS 8 (disambiguation)
- DOS 20 (disambiguation)
- DOS 286 (disambiguation)
