= DOS 2 =

DOS 2 or DOS-2 may refer to:

- A failed Soviet space station DOS-2, part of the Salyut programme
- Atari DOS 2.0 for Atari 8-bit computers

It may also refer to versions of the Microsoft MS-DOS family:

- MS-DOS 2.00, Microsoft (internal) version in 1982 and 1983, successor of MS-DOS 1.xx, licensed to various OEMs including IBM
- MS-DOS 2.01, Microsoft (internal) version in 1983
- MS-DOS 2.10, Microsoft (internal) version in 1983
- MS-DOS 2.11, Microsoft (internal) version in 1983
  - MS-DOS 2.11R, a ROMed version for Tandy PCs in 1988
- MS-DOS 2.12, a special OEM version for the TI Professional in 1983/1984
- MS-DOS 2.25, Microsoft version with extended multilanguage support in 1985

It may also refer to versions of the IBM PC DOS family:

- PC DOS 2.0, successor of PC DOS 1.1 in 1983
- PC DOS 2.1, successor of PC DOS 2.0 in 1983
- PC DOS 2.11, successor of PC DOS 2.1 in 1984

It may also refer to operating systems of the Digital Research family:

- DOS Plus 1.0, a single-user variant of Concurrent PC DOS in 1985
- DOS Plus 1.1, a single-user variant of Concurrent PC DOS in 1985
- DOS Plus 1.2, a single-user variant of Concurrent PC DOS 4.1 in 1986
- DOS Plus 2.1, a single-user variant of Concurrent PC DOS 5.0 in 1988

== See also ==
- DOS (disambiguation)
- DOS 1 (disambiguation)
- DOS 3 (disambiguation)
- DOS 20 (disambiguation)
- DOS 286 (disambiguation)
