= DOS 7 =

DOS 7 or DOS-7 may refer to:

- Mir Core Module a.k.a. DOS-7, Russian spacecraft

It may also refer to versions of the DR-DOS family:

- Novell DOS 7, successor of Digital Research's DR DOS 6.0 and NetWare PalmDOS 1.0 in 1993
- OpenDOS 7.01, successor of Novell DOS 7 by Caldera in 1997
- DR-OpenDOS 7.02, successor of OpenDOS 7.01 by Caldera in 1997
- DR-DOS 7.02, successor of DR-OpenDOS 7.02 by Caldera in 1998
- DR-DOS 7.03, successor of DR-DOS 7.02 by Caldera in 1999
- DR-DOS 7.04, LBA/FAT32-enabled OEM version of DR-DOS
- DR-DOS 7.05, LBA/FAT32-enabled OEM version and successor of DR-DOS 7.04
- DR-DOS 7.06, LBA/FAT32-enabled OEM version of DR-DOS
- DR-DOS 7.07, LBA/FAT32-enabled OEM version of DR-DOS

It may also refer to versions of the Microsoft MS-DOS family:

- MS-DOS 7.0, LBA-enabled DOS component bundled with Windows 95 in 1995
- MS-DOS 7.1, LBA/FAT32-enabled DOS component bundled with Windows 98/98 SE in 1998/1999

It may also refer to versions of the IBM PC DOS family:

- PC DOS 7, successor of PC DOS 6.3 in 1995
- PC DOS 2000, successor of PC DOS 7.0 in 1998
- PC DOS 7.10, LBA/FAT32-enabled OEM version and successor of PC DOS 2000

It may also refer to versions of the PhysTechSoft PTS-DOS family:

- PTS-DOS 7.0, 32-bit DOS variant in 1995
- PTS-DOS 32, 32-bit DOS variant

It may also refer to versions of the DataLight ROM-DOS family:

- ROM-DOS 7.1, LBA/FAT32-enabled ROM-DOS variant

== See also ==
- DOS 6 (disambiguation)
- DOS 8 (disambiguation)
- DOS (disambiguation)
