= Shepardson Microsystems =

- Type: Private
- Industry: Microcomputer Software
- Founder: Robert Shepardson
- Defunct: 1981
- Successor: Optimized Systems Software
- Headquarters: Saratoga Springs, New York, United States

Shepardson Microsystems, Inc. (SMI) was a small computer programming company founded by Robert (Bob) Shepardson in Saratoga Springs, New York. SMI is best known for producing operating systems and programming languages for CP/M, the Atari 8-bit computers and Apple II. SMI is most noted for the original Apple II disk operating system (DOS), Atari BASIC, and Atari DOS.

In 1981, the owner decided the market for 8-bit software was not sustainable, and returned to a one-man consulting firm. Two of the employees purchased the rights to their systems and formed Optimized Systems Software, which operated until 1988.

== CP/M ==
The company got its start in the microcomputer arena by producing a series of BASIC programming language interpreters for the burgeoning S-100 bus computer market. Their first product was Cromemco 16k BASIC, which, as the name implies, was intended to run on Cromemco Z-series Z80-based computers with 16 kB of RAM.

As machines shipped with ever-increasing amounts of RAM, due largely to the replacement of SRAM with the much denser DRAM in the mid-1970s, SMI further expanded their version as the 26 kB Cromemco Structured BASIC, while a cut-down 12 kB version was released as CP/A Business BASIC.

At the time they were written, Microsoft BASIC was widespread but not as universal as it would be by the early 1980s. SMI's BASICs were based on the concepts and syntax of Data General Business Basic (which was very similar to HP Time-Shared BASIC), as opposed to Digital's BASIC-PLUS that formed the basis for MS BASIC. As a result, SMI's BASICs incorporated a different way to handle strings and input/output, a difference that would be seen in their later languages for the Atari.

== Apple Computer ==
On April 10, 1978, Shepardson Microsystems signed a contract with Apple. For $13,000 (equivalent to $64,200 in 2025) — $5,200 up front, and $7,800 on delivery, and no additional royalties — Shepardson Microsystems would build Apple DOS, Apple's first disk operating system — and hand it over just 35 days later. For its money, Apple would get a file manager, an interface for Integer BASIC and Applesoft BASIC, and utilities that would allow disk backup, disk recovery, and file copying. Apple provided detailed specifications, and early Apple employee Randy Wigginton worked closely with Shepardson's Paul Laughton as the latter wrote the operating system with punched cards and a minicomputer. That deal enabled release and sales of Apple's Disk II drive.

== Atari, Inc. ==
Atari, Inc. planned to follow up its successful Video Computer System console with more powerful home computers (the Atari 400 and 800), to be introduced at the January 1979 Consumer Electronics Show. A version of Microsoft BASIC for the MOS Technology 6502 had been licensed for the systems, but the task of retrofitting the code into an 8k cartridge proved too difficult.

Atari turned to Shepardson Microsystems to help with the port, but after struggling with it themselves, they proposed developing a new BASIC instead of using Microsoft BASIC. Atari contracted with SMI not only for Atari BASIC, but the Atari Disk Operating System as well. SMI had their BASIC finished before the December 28, 1978 delivery of the contract, which included a $1000 bonus for early completion.

In early 1981, Shepardson sold its BASIC and DOS products, along with the Atari Assembler Editor, to employees Bill Wilkinson and Mike Peters, who formed Optimized Systems Software. OSS developed enhanced versions of all three and published them under different titles.
