= Frank Ostrowski =

German programmer (1960–2011)

Frank Ostrowski (1960 – 2011) was a German programmer best known for his implementations of the BASIC programming language.

After his time with the German Federal Armed Forces, Frank Ostrowski was unemployed for three years. During this time, he developed Turbo-Basic XL for the Atari 8-bit computers. It was published in the German language magazine Happy Computer in December 1985 as Listing of the Month. Turbo-Basic XL is both much faster and has more features than the standard Atari BASIC.

He soon got a job with GFA Systemtechnik GmbH (at the time known as Integral Hydraulik) where he wrote GFA BASIC on the Atari ST which became one of the more popular BASICs on that platform.

Frank Ostrowski died in 2011 after a severe disease.
