= DOS 1 =

DOS 1 or DOS-1 may refer to:

- The Soviet space station Salyut 1, also called DOS-1

It may also refer to versions of Seattle Computer Product's 86-DOS (the predecessor to MS-DOS and PC DOS):

- 86-DOS 1.00, SCP OEM released version on 28 April 1981, licensed to OEMs including Microsoft
- 86-DOS 1.01, SCP internal version in May 1981
- 86-DOS 1.10, SCP OEM released version in July 1981, sold to Microsoft and renamed to MS-DOS
- 86-DOS 1.14, basis for IBM Personal Computer DOS 1.0

It may also refer to versions of the Microsoft MS-DOS family:

- MS-DOS 1.11, Microsoft internal version in 1981
- MS-DOS 1.12, Microsoft internal version in 1981
- MS-DOS 1.13, Microsoft internal version in 1981
- MS-DOS 1.20, Microsoft internal version in 1981
- MS-DOS 1.21, Microsoft internal version in 1982
- MS-DOS 1.22, Microsoft internal version in 1982
- MS-DOS 1.23, Microsoft internal version in 1982
- MS-DOS 1.24, Microsoft internal version in 1982, basis for IBM Personal Computer DOS 1.1
- MS-DOS 1.25, basis for OEM versions of MS-DOS other than IBM in 1982, including SCP MS-DOS 1.25
- MS-DOS 1.26, Microsoft internal version in 1982
- MS-DOS 1.27, Microsoft internal version in 1982
- MS-DOS 1.28, Microsoft internal version in 1982
- MS-DOS 1.29, Microsoft internal version in 1982
- MS-DOS 1.30, Microsoft internal version in 1982
- MS-DOS 1.40, Microsoft internal version in 1982
- MS-DOS 1.41, Microsoft internal version in 1982
- MS-DOS 1.50, Microsoft internal version in 1982
- MS-DOS 1.51, Microsoft internal version in 1982
- MS-DOS 1.52, Microsoft internal version in 1982
- MS-DOS 1.53, Microsoft internal version in 1982
- MS-DOS 1.54, Microsoft internal version in 1982

It may also refer to versions of the IBM Personal Computer DOS family:

- IBM Personal Computer DOS 1.0, OEM version of 86-DOS 1.14 in 1981
- IBM Personal Computer DOS 1.1, OEM version of MS-DOS 1.24 in 1982

It may also refer to versions of the Digital Research operating system family:

- DOS Plus 1.0, a single-user variant of Concurrent PC DOS in 1985
- DOS Plus 1.1, a single-user variant of Concurrent PC DOS in 1985
- DOS Plus 1.2, a single-user variant of Concurrent PC DOS 4.1 in 1986
- PalmDOS 1.0, a Novell successor to Digital Research's DR DOS 6.0 tailored for early palmtop PCs

It may also refer to versions of the FreeDOS operating system:

- FreeDOS 1.0, a free and open-source DOS 7.1-compatible operating system distributed since September 2006
- FreeDOS 1.1, a successor released in January 2012
- FreeDOS 1.2, a successor released in December 2016

== See also ==
- DOS (disambiguation)
- DOS 2 (disambiguation)
- DOS 10 (disambiguation)
