= DOS 8 =

DOS 8 or DOS-8 may refer to:

- DR-DOS 8.0, a version of DR-DOS distributed by DeviceLogics in 2004
- MS-DOS 8.0, the MS-DOS sub-system bundled in Microsoft Windows ME in 2000
- DOS-8 a.k.a. Mir-2, Russian spacecraft project of Salyut program in 2000
- Zvezda (ISS module), the final destination of the Russian DOS-8 module

== See also ==
- 86-DOS
- DOS (disambiguation)
- DOS 7 (disambiguation)
- DOS 10 (disambiguation)
