= DOS 6 =

DOS 6 or DOS-6 may refer to:

In computing:

- DR DOS 6.0 by Novell
- MS-DOS 6.x by Microsoft
- IBM PC DOS 6.x by IBM
- Novell DOS 7, which reports itself as "PC DOS 6.0"
- DR-DOS 7.x, which reports itself as "PC DOS 6.0"
- ROM-DOS 6.22 by Datalight
- Paragon DOS Pro 2000 by PhysTechSoft
- PTS-DOS 6.x by PhysTechSoft

Others:

- DOS-6, Soviet space station Salyut 7

== See also ==
- DOS 5 (disambiguation)
- DOS 7 (disambiguation)
- DOS (disambiguation)
