= DOS 20 =

DOS 20 may refer to IBM OS/2 versions:

- OS/2 2.0 ("DOS" version 20.00)
- OS/2 2.1 ("DOS" version 20.10)
- OS/2 Warp 3 ("DOS" version 20.30)
- OS/2 Warp 4 ("DOS" version 20.40)
- OS/2 Warp 4.5 ("DOS" version 20.45)

== See also ==
- DOS (disambiguation)
- DOS 2 (disambiguation)
- DOS 10 (disambiguation)
- DOS 30
