= DOS 386 =

DOS 386 or DOS/386 may refer to:

- Concurrent DOS 386, a Digital Research CP/M- and DOS-compatible multiuser multitasking operating system variant since 1987
- FlexOS 386, a Digital Research FlexOS operating system variant since 1987
- PC-MOS/386, a DOS-compatible multiuser, multitasking operating system produced by The Software Link since 1987

== See also ==
- DOS 3 (disambiguation)
- DOS 286 (disambiguation)
- DOS (disambiguation)
- DOS/360
