= DOS 4 =

DOS 4 or DOS-4 may refer to:

- The Soviet space station Salyut 4

Versions of the IBM PC DOS family:

- IBM DOS 3.40, announced successor of IBM DOS 3.30 in 1988
- IBM DOS 4.00, released successor of IBM DOS 3.40 in 1988
- IBM DOS 4.01, a bug-fix release at the end of the same year
- IBM DOS 4.02, a ROMed version of DOS in IBM PS/1 machines

Versions of the Microsoft MS-DOS family:

- MS-DOS 4.0 (multitasking), a multitasking version in 1986/1987 by Microsoft
- MS-DOS 4.1 (multitasking), a multitasking version for the ICL DRS PWS in 1987
- MS-DOS 3.40, announced successor of MS-DOS 3.31 in 1988
- MS-DOS 4.00 (IBM-developed), successor to MS-DOS 3.31 in 1988
- MS-DOS 4.01, a bug-fix release in 1988
  - Russian MS-DOS 4.01, a special Russian version of MS-DOS 4.01 (RDOS) in 1990

== See also ==
- 4DOS
- DOS (disambiguation)
- DOS 3 (disambiguation)
- DOS 5 (disambiguation)
