= DOS 286 =

DOS 286 or DOS/286 may refer to:

- Concurrent DOS 286, a Digital Research CP/M- and DOS-compatible multiuser multitasking operating system variant since 1985
- FlexOS 286, a Digital Research FlexOS operating system variant since 1986
- OS/2 1.0, an IBM and Microsoft operating system and then-times supposed-to-be successor of MS-DOS/PC DOS since 1987

== See also ==
- DOS 2 (disambiguation)
- DOS 5 (disambiguation)
- DOS 386 (disambiguation)
- DOS (disambiguation)
