= Turbo-BASIC XL =

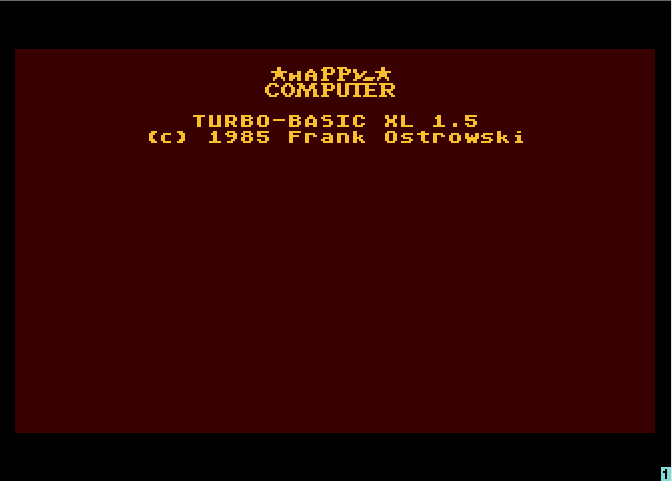
- Version 1.5 startup screen
- Original author: Frank Ostrowski
- Initial release: December 1985; 39 years ago
- Written in: 6502 assembly
- Platform: Atari 8-bit

Turbo-BASIC XL is an enhanced version of the BASIC programming language for Atari 8-bit computers. It is a compatible superset of the Atari BASIC that shipped with the computers. Turbo-Basic XL was developed by Frank Ostrowski and published in the December 1985 issue of German computer magazine Happy Computer. A version for the 400/800 models was released shortly after as Frost Basic 1.4. Several modified versions working with different DOS systems have been released by other authors.

Turbo-Basic XL greatly improves execution speed over Atari BASIC. An Atari BASIC program loaded into Turbo-BASIC, with no changes made, would generally run about three to four times as fast. A Turbo-Basic XL compiler created binary executables, further speeding up program performance to about ten times faster than Atari BASIC. Turbo-Basic XL also includes an expanded editor, support for named procedures, WHILE...ENDWHILE and similar block constructs, and added access to the underlying hardware, which, among other things, allowed operation of attached floppy drives without exiting to DOS.

Ostrowski soon got a job with GFA Systemtechnik GmbH (at the time known as Integral Hydraulik) where he adapted Turbo-Basic XL into GFA BASIC for the Atari ST, which became one of the more popular BASICs on that platform.

== Background ==
The poor execution speed of Atari BASIC, which shipped with all Atari 8-bit models, led to a market for 3rd party BASIC interpreters and compilers with better performance or more commands. Among them was an official port of Microsoft BASIC sold by Atari, Inc. and several improved versions released by Optimized Systems Software, who had written the original Atari BASIC under contract. There were also Atari BASIC compilers from several companies.

Turbo-Basic XL was a late entry to this list, first published in December 1985 as type-in program in Happy Computer magazine. It came in both interpreter and compiler versions. Turbo-Basic XL takes advantage of the extra memory of the XL (and later XE) series machines, preventing it from running on the original 400 and 800. A version supporting those systems was later released as Frost BASIC (short for "Frank Ostrowski").

The internal disk-related commands are tied to particular versions of DOS. A number of ports to different versions of DOS became available.

== Performance ==
The most notable feature of Turbo-Basic was its dramatically improved speed; an unmodified Atari BASIC program loaded into Turbo-Basic would normally run three to five times faster, and the speed advantage improved as the program size grew. It also had a compiler that increased the speed of listings by a factor of 15 to 20. This was due largely to a series of improvements on well-known problems in the original Atari BASIC code.

In most BASICs, GOTO was handled by reading the associated line number and then searching through the program for that line of code. In MS-derived BASICs the line numbers were stored as 16-bit integers and numeric constants in the code in their original ASCII format. When a line like GOTO 1000 was encountered, the interpreter would use special code to convert the four ASCII characters "1000" into 16-bit integer format and then search for it. Atari BASIC worked differently, converting all numeric constants to a 6-byte floating-point format when the line was entered. This meant the "1000" was no longer in ASCII format and had to be converted from floating-point to integer format. The code for doing so was not well optimized and could take over 2 ms (average 1-1.5 ms).

FOR...NEXT loops are another common construct in BASIC programs. In most BASICs, when the FOR portion was encountered at runtime, its memory location in the source code was pushed onto a call stack so it could easily return to that location when the associated NEXT was encountered. For unknown reasons, Atari BASIC pushed the line number of the FOR onto the stack and then looked through the entire code for that line when it encountered the NEXT. For programs that did significant looping, which is often the case in BASIC, this could cause a dramatic performance hit.

Turbo-Basic implemented its FOR loops using the address, as was the case in MS BASIC, and thus ran loops with roughly the same performance as MS. It then went further and greatly improved GOTO performance as well. Line numbers were sent into a hash function that broke them into 256-line chunks. As the program was entered, the address of the first of each of these chunks was stored in a 128-value table. At runtime, when a line number lookup was needed, it would first pick the nearest-but-lower value in the table, retrieve the address, and then begin scanning for the line from that point on. The improvement was most notable in larger programs where the scanning time was increasingly expensive, which is why Turbo-Basic could hit a 5-times increase in larger programs.

The other major source of poor performance in Atari BASIC was its very slow binary-coded decimal (BCD) floating point code. The library, contained in a separate 2K ROM and considered part of the operating system as opposed to BASIC itself, had been written in a hurry and never optimized. Some of the routines, notably the multiply and exponents functions, were far slower than they could be.

Turbo-Basic fixed this by including its own complete floating-point library, which not only fixed many of these issues but also further optimized the code by unrolling small loops. For programs that used math extensively, the new library resulted in dramatic performance improvements, sending the Atari from near the bottom of the Creative Computing Benchmark lists to near the top, beating a number of machines that were much faster in hardware.

== New features ==
Among the extra features of Turbo-Basic XL, added to Atari BASIC, are the following:

- enhanced sound and graphics commands
- more flexible I/O commands, including disk access
- structured programming constructs
- simple debugging facilities

== See also ==
- BASIC A+
