= Doss =

Doss or DOSS may refer to:

== Places ==
- Doss, Missouri, USA
- Doss, Gillespie County, Texas, USA; in Gillespie County
- Doss, Cass County, Texas, USA
- Doss Glacier, Queen Elizabeth Range, Antarctica
- Lagh Doss, San Bernardino, Val Mesolcina, Grisons, Switzerland; a lake

== People ==
- Doss (surname)
- Desmond Doss World War II Medal of Honor recipient
- Doss Richerson (died 1979) U.S. athlete
- Mabel Doss Day Lea (1856–1906) U.S. politician
- Russ Rebholz (1908–2002; nicknamed "Doss") U.S. professional Canadian football player
- Doss (born 1990) American electronic musician

== Education ==
- "doss subjects", United Kingdom slang for easy subjects
- Doss Consolidated Common School District, Texas, USA
- Doss Elementary School (Austin, Texas), USA
- Doss High School, Louisville, Kentucky, USA

== Music ==
- Doss, the self-titled EP by Doss, 2014
- The Death of Slim Shady (Coup de Grâce), an album by Eminem, 2024

== Other uses ==
- A dosshouse is a British term for a flophouse
- Doss & Co., Golaghat, Assam, India; the oldest department store in Golaghat
- Dioctyl sodium sulfosuccinate
- Doss porphyria, aminolevulinic acid dehydratase deficiency porphyria

== See also ==
- Dos (disambiguation)
