= Interactive Picture Systems =

American software company

Interactive Picture Systems, or IPS, was a software developer located in Philadelphia from 1982 to 1985. The company was run by partners Guy Nouri of NYC and Eric Podietz of Philadelphia. Staff included Jimmy Snyder, Mark Scott, Ken Appleman, Bob Svihovec, and Chip Kaye. IPS developed educational and creativity software initially for the Atari 8-bit computers, then for the Apple II, and Commodore 64. Movie Maker (1984) allows users to build elaborate animated sequences for the Atari 8-bit computers which can then be distributed as standalone files. It was initially released by Reston Publishing, then later by Electronic Arts along with Commodore 64 port.

== Software ==
=== Creativity ===
- PAINT! (1982, Atari 8-bit, Reston)
- Movie Maker (1984, Atari 8-bit, Reston) also published by Electronic Arts in 1985

=== Educational ===
- Trains (1983, Atari 8-bit, Spinnaker)
- Aerobics (1984, Atari 8-bit, Spinnaker)
- Grandma's House (1984, Atari 8-bit, Spinnaker)
- Operation Frog (1984, Apple II & C64, Scholastic) virtual-dissection software; introduced at the 1984 Summer CES
