= Atari Assembler Editor =

- Original author: Kathleen O'Brien
- Developer: Shepardson Microsystems
- Release: 1981; 45 years ago
- Platform: Atari 8-bit
- Size: 8 KB
- Type: Assembler
- License: Proprietary software

Atari Assembler Editor (sometimes written as Atari Assembler/Editor) is a ROM cartridge-based development system released by Atari, Inc. in 1981. It is used to edit, assemble, and debug 6502 programs for Atari 8-bit computers without the need for additional tools and even works without a disk drive or cassette drive (minus the ability to save programs).

Assembler Editor was programmed by Kathleen O'Brien of Shepardson Microsystems, the company which wrote Atari BASIC. The Assembler Editor presents a programming environment similar to BASIC, with text-based commands and line numbered source code. Unlike Atari BASIC, programs are not parsed into tokens as each line is entered.

Assembly times are slow, making the cartridge challenging to use for larger programs. In the manual, Atari recommends the Assembler Editor as a tool for writing subroutines to speed up Atari BASIC, which would be much smaller than full applications. The Atari Macro Assembler was offered as an alternative with better performance and more features, such as macros, but it is disk-based, copy-protected, and does not include an editor or debugger. Despite the suggestion, commercial software was written using the Assembler Editor, such as the games Eastern Front (1941), Caverns of Mars, Galahad and the Holy Grail, and Kid Grid.

The source code to the original Assembler Editor was licensed to Optimized Systems Software who shipped EASMD based on it.

== Development environment ==
The Assembler Editor is a two-pass 6502 assembler in an 8KB cartridge. Both source and object code can be in memory simultaneously, allowing repeated editing, assembly, and running of the resulting code without accessing a disk or tape drive.

=== Edit ===
The cartridge starts in EDIT mode. The programmer enters lines of assembly source into the Atari BASIC-like editor. Source text must be prefixed with a line number or it is interpreted as a command. Like Atari BASIC, Assembler Editor includes an ENTER command that can be used to combine files together into a single larger program listing. Unlike Atari BASIC, Assembler Editor includes commands for automatically creating spaced-out line numbers, as well as renumbering lines and deleting them en masse. A FIND command is useful when working with labels.

Instructions are listed in the order they will be placed in memory. The starting point for instructions is specified with the *= directive, so, for instance, code intended to be placed in the special "page six" would be prefixed with the line *= $0600. Variable names can be assigned to specific addresses, and this was often combined with an increment *= *+1 to directly encode offsets into tables.

Values following instructions are normally interpreted as "the value at this memory address", but an actual numeric value can be provided as an "immediate operand" by appending it with a hash, like LDA #12, which loads the accumulator with the decimal value 12. Hexadecimal is indicated with a dollar sign, LDA #$12 loads the accumulator with 12 hex, or 18 decimal. Indirect addressing is supported using parentheses; LDA ($600) uses the values in location $600,$601 to produce a 16-bit address, and then loads the accumulator with the value found at that location.

Errors are reported with numeric codes that can be looked up in the manual. There are 19 assembler-specific codes and 16 additional codes for operating system input/output errors.

=== Assemble ===
Code is assembled by typing the ASM command into the editor.

Assembler Editor was widely derided as the slowest assembler on the platform. Much of this is from sharing code with Atari BASIC, also written by Shepardson Microsystems. Atari BASIC uses slow routines used to convert numeric constants in code to an internal binary-coded decimal representation via operating system routines. All numbers, even line numbers, have to be converted to binary-coded decimal. It also means that 1E2 is a legal line number.

=== Debug ===
The debugger, really a machine code monitor, is entered with the BUG command. The X command returns to EDIT mode. The debugger allows the viewing and changing of registers and memory locations, code tracing, single-step and disassembly.

== History ==
Assembler Editor was written by Kathleen O'Brien of Shepardson Microsystems. The company had been hired by Atari to help fit Microsoft 6502 BASIC onto an 8KB ROM, something programmers at Atari were struggling with. Instead, Bill Wilkinson suggested designing an entirely new version of BASIC, which became Atari BASIC.

While Atari BASIC was being written, primarily by Paul Laughton, O'Brien's husband, O'Brien worked on the Assembler Editor. It was written by punching codes into a punch tape machine, running the tape through an EPROM burner, and then testing the resulting ROM in an Atari 800. The cartridge was completed before Atari BASIC, and O'Brien spent some time working on portions of that project as well.

As part of Shepardson's work, a number of common routines were incorporated into the Atari computer's operating system, including the floating point math functions. These were written by O'Brien, the first floating point math code she worked on. The low performance of key functions affected both Atari BASIC and the Assembler Editor and was a topic that Wilkinson often wrote about.

== Example code ==
The following is 6502 code for Hello World! written for the Assembler Editor:

10 ; HELLO.ASM
20 ; ---------
30 ;
40 ; THIS ATARI ASSEMBLY PROGRAM
50 ; WILL PRINT THE "HELLO WORLD"
60 ; MESSAGE TO THE SCREEN
70 ;
0100 ; CIO EQUATES
0110 ; ===========
0120     *=  $0340   ;START OF IOCB
0130 IOCB
0140 ;
0150 ICHID *= *+1    ;DEVICE HANDLER
0160 ICDNO *= *+1    ;DEVICE NUMBER
0170 ICCOM *= *+1    ;I/O COMMAND
0180 ICSTA *= *+1    ;I/O STATUS
0190 ICBAL *= *+1    ;LSB BUFFER ADDR
0200 ICBAH *= *+1    ;MSB BUFFER ADDR
0210 ICPTL *= *+1    ;LSB PUT ROUTINE
0220 ICPTH *= *+1    ;MSB PUT ROUTINE
0230 ICBLL *= *+1    ;LSB BUFFER LEN
0240 ICBLH *= *+1    ;MSB BUFFER LEN
0250 ICAX1 *= *+1    ;AUX BYTE 1
0260 ICAX2 *= *+1    ;AUX BYTE 1
0270 ;
0280 GETREC = 5      ;GET TEXT RECORD
0290 PUTREC = 9      ;PUT TEXT RECORD
0300 ;
0310 CIOV =  $E456   ;CIO ENTRY VECTOR
0320 RUNAD = $02E0   ;RUN ADDRESS
0330 EOL   = $9B     ;END OF LINE
0340 ;
0350 ; SETUP FOR CIO
0360 ; -------------
0370     *= $0600
0380 START LDX #0    ;IOCB 0
0390     LDA #PUTREC ;WANT OUTPUT
0400     STA ICCOM,X ;ISSUE CMD
0410     LDA #MSG&255 ;LOW BYTE OF MSG
0420     STA ICBAL,X ; INTO ICBAL
0430     LDA #MSG/256 ;HIGH BYTE
0440     STA ICBAH,X ; INTO ICBAH
0450     LDA #0      ;LENGTH OF MSG
0460     STA ICBLH,X ; HIGH BYTE
0470     LDA #$FF    ;255 CHAR LENGTH
0480     STA ICBLL,X ; LOW BYTE
0490 ;
0500 ; CALL CIO TO PRINT
0510 ; -----------------
0520     JSR CIOV    ;CALL CIO
0530     RTS         ;EXIT TO DOS
0540 ;
0550 ; OUR MESSAGE
0560 ; -----------
0570 MSG .BYTE "HELLO WORLD!",EOL
0580 ;
0590 ; INIT RUN ADDRESS
0600 ; ----------------
0610     *=  RUNAD
0620     .WORD START
0630     .END

These commands can be interactively entered to assemble the code, enter the debugger, run the program, then exit the debugger when it is finished:

ASM
BUG
G600
X

== Legacy ==
Shortly after Shepardson delivered Assembler Editor and Atari BASIC to Atari, Bob Shepardson, the owner, decided to return to being a one-person company. O'Brien, Laughton, and Wilkinson formed their own company, Optimized Systems Software (OSS), to continue development of the Atari products. They licensed the original source code for BASIC, Assembler Editor, and Atari DOS, which they had collectively written.

In 1981, OSS released an improved version of Assembler Editor, EASMD on floppy disk. EASMD was replaced by MAC/65 in 1982. MAC/65 was one of the fastest assemblers on the platform. Much of the improved performance of MAC/65 is the result of tokenizing lines of code as they're entered—as is the case with Atari BASIC—to reduce the amount of work needed at assembly time.

Assembler Editor continued to be available from Atari, and increased in popularity as the price dropped to US$10 or 5 in the latter half of the 1980s.
