= GFA BASIC =

Computer programming language

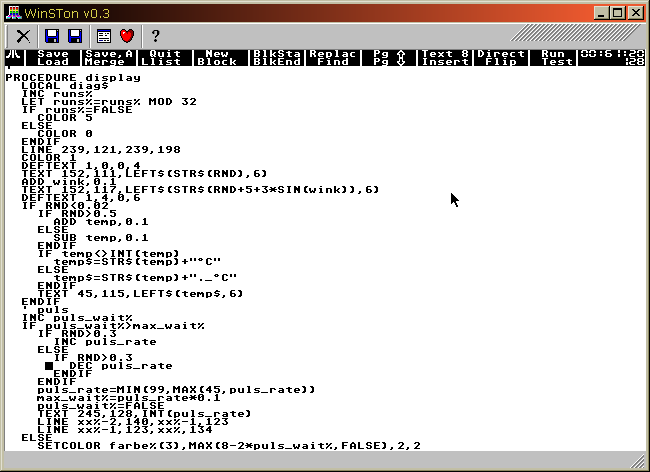
- A screenshot of the GFA BASIC editor.
- Original author(s): Frank Ostrowski
- Initial release: 1986; 39 years ago
- Final release: 3.6
- Operating system: Amiga, Atari ST, MS-DOS, Microsoft Windows
- Type: BASIC

GFA BASIC is a dialect of the BASIC programming language.

== History ==
GFA BASIC was developed by Frank Ostrowski at "GFA Systemtechnik GmbH" (later "GFA Software"), a German company in Kiel and Düsseldorf, as a proprietary version of his free BASIC implementation, Turbo-Basic XL. GFA is an acronym for "Gesellschaft für Automatisierung" ("Company for Automation"), which gave name to the software. The first GFA BASIC version was released in 1986. In the mid and late 1980s it became popular for the Atari ST, because the Atari ST BASIC shipped with them was more primitive. Ports were later released for the Amiga, MS-DOS, and Windows.

Version 2.0 was the most popular release of GFA BASIC as it offered more advanced features compared to alternatives. GFA BASIC 3.0 added support for user-defined structures and other agglomerated data types. The final released version was 3.6. Around 2002 GFA software ceased all GFA BASIC activities and shut down the mailinglist and website in 2005. Due to official support of GFA BASIC having ceased the user community took over the support and installed an own communication infrastructure.

== Features and functionality ==
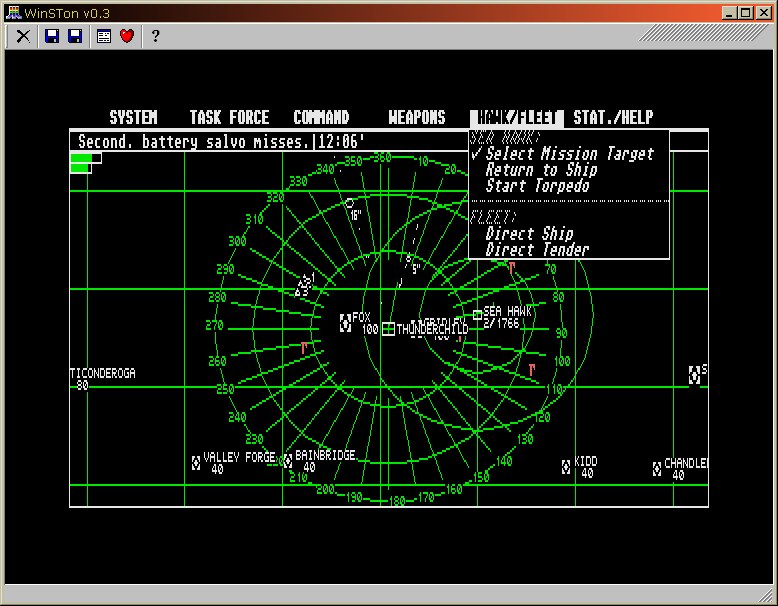
A screenshot of a GFA BASIC program running at medium resolution, under the WinSTon emulator. Note the menu and window which were programmed with GFA BASIC using the ST's GEM functions.

== Manual ==
Some editions of the GFA manual were printed with black ink on red paper, in an attempt to thwart photocopying and bootlegging. The effectiveness of this tactic was questionable.

== Applications ==
Éric Chahi wrote a game editor in GFA basic to create his game Another World, including scene design and game scripting; only the game engine (polygon rendering and music) was done in assembler. This editor was used to make all ports of the game, including for consoles and the Collector Edition for Windows released in 2006.

Karsten Köper of Thalion software wrote all the basic game editing software for the "Amberstar" series using GFA Basic.
