= DOS 5 =

DOS 5 or DOS-5 may refer to:

- The Soviet space station Salyut 6
- DOS 5 (OS/2), one of the early project names for the then still unreleased IBM and Microsoft OS/2 1.0 between 1985 and 1987
- DR DOS 5.0
- MS-DOS 5.x, by Microsoft
- IBM PC DOS 5.x, by IBM

== See also ==
- DOS (disambiguation)
- DOS 4 (disambiguation)
- DOS 6 (disambiguation)
- DOS/V
