= Games Computers Play =

The Customs area of Games Computers Play, with text chat display.

In the 1980s, Games Computers Play (GCP) was an online service written by Gardner Pomper and Greg Hogg and one of the first multiplayer online games (MOGs) to offer a graphical user interface (GUI). The service launched sometime in early 1985, beaten only by a few months by PlayNET on the Commodore 64, which ultimately became America Online.

The system was primarily accessible with Atari 8-bit computers with a minimum of 48k of memory. A version for the Atari ST was also available late in the service's life. The service only garnered about 1,000 subscribers at its peak.

== See also ==
- GEnie, General Electric's online service (1985–1999)
