= Movie Maker (Reston Publishing) =

1984 animation production software

Movie Maker (also referred to as Reston Movie Maker) is a computer program published by Reston Publishing Company in 1984 which allows users to author full screen animated sequences at a resolution of 160×96 with 4 colors. Audio can be added from a built-in library of sound effects. Self-playing movies can be viewed without the Movie Maker software. It was developed by Interactive Picture Systems for Atari 8-bit computers. In 1985 it was re-published by Electronic Arts, including a port to the Commodore 64.

== Reception ==
David P. Stone reviewed the program for Computer Gaming World, and stated that "if you have a need, or desire, for presenting non-game, impressive animation sequences, then MMTK won't let you down. But, to fully enjoy MMTK you must have the deep personal conviction that 'getting there is half the fun'."

A 1984 Antic review contained an addendum from the editor: "ANTIC was so impressed with Movie Maker that we asked the Interactive Picture Systems people to design an animated greeting card for us, which they did to the delight of all who have seen it." The only major dislike from the reviewer was having to use sounds from the existing, fixed library.

Gregg Williams reviewed the Atari 8-bit Electronic Arts release for Computer Gaming World. He wrote, "a so-called animation studio that promises 'dazzling animated graphics made easy.' The reality is four-color 'movies' (four colors—on an Atari?!) so amateurish and primitive that they would impress only a 4-year-old."
