= Mapping the Atari =

Instructional publication

- First edition
- Author: Ian Chadwick
- Language: English
- Subject: Atari 8-bit
- Publisher: COMPUTE! Books
- Publication date: 1983, 1985
- Publication place: United States
- ISBN: 0-87455-004-1
- OCLC: 13271042
- Dewey Decimal: 005.265 19
- LC Class: QA76.8.A82 C424 1985

Mapping the Atari, written by Ian Chadwick and published by COMPUTE! Books in 1983, is an address-by-address explanation of the memory layout of the Atari 8-bit computers. The introduction is by Optimized Systems Software co-founder Bill Wilkinson.

The book covers the 64K address space of the system's 6502 processor from low to high, including addresses used by the operating system or mapped to hardware registers, as well as how to use them. For example, location 756 (2F4) CHBAS contains the starting memory address that tells ANTIC where to find the character set. The author explains how to use this feature to build custom character sets.

An updated version covering changes to the operating system and newer machines like the 130XE followed in 1985. Antic magazine serialized the book in 1989 and 1990.

== Reception ==
The Addison-Wesley Book of Atari Software 1984 recommended Mapping the Atari, calling it "the most valuable reference book for machine language programmers". Joe Decuir recommended the book to software developers, along with De Re Atari, "when you're trying to figure out where everything is". Antic introduced the serialized version of the book as follows:

Ian Chadwick's "Mapping The Atari" has been one of the core references for Atari 8-bit programmers since the first edition was published in 1983... But it is much more than that. It is a virtual encyclopedia of indispensable information about the inner workings of the Atari.
