= BASIC A+ =

Implementation of the BASIC programming language

- Developer: Optimized Systems Software
- Release: 1983; 43 years ago
- Operating system: Atari 8-bit
- Type: BASIC
- License: Copyright © 1983 Optimized Systems Software Proprietary

BASIC A+ is an implementation of the BASIC programming language for Atari 8-bit computers introduced by Optimized Systems Software in 1981. It was developed by the team that created Atari BASIC, which shipped with each computer, and is compatible. BASIC A+. BASIC A+ adds new features to the language, such as IF..ELSE..ENDIF statements, support for hardware features like player/missile graphics, and commands for debugging. While Atari BASIC is an 8 KB ROM cartridge, BASIC A+ is floppy disk based and uses 15 KB of the computer's RAM, leaving 23 KB available for user programs in a 48 KB Atari 800. BASIC A+ shipped with a supplement to the Atari BASIC reference manual as its documentation.

Optimized Systems Software followed BASIC A+ with the cartridge-based BASIC XL, then BASIC XE.

== See also ==
- Turbo-Basic XL
