= DOS XL =

Disk operating system

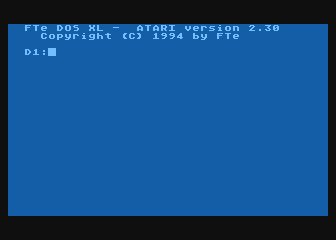
- Original authors: Paul Laughton; Mark Rose; Bill Wilkinson; Mike Peters
- Developer: Optimized Systems Software
- Final release: 2.30 / 1984; 42 years ago
- Platform: Atari 8-bit
- Type: Atari DOS
- License: Proprietary software

DOS XL is a discontinued Disk Operating System (DOS) written by Paul Laughton, Mark Rose, Bill Wilkinson, and Mike Peters and published by Optimized Systems Software (OSS) for the Atari 8-bit computers. It was designed to be compatible with Atari DOS which shipped with Atari, Inc.'s disk drives, which had also been written by the same team.

== Description ==
=== Features ===
A direct descendant of OS/A+, DOS XL provided additional features to Atari's equipped with floppy disk drives. These included single and double-density support, a command-line mode (called the command processor or CP), a menu mode (an executable loaded in memory), batch file support, and support for XL extended memory and OSS SuperCartridge banked memory. Later versions included Axlon RamDisk support, Mosaic RamDisk support, BIT-3 support and BUG/65.

In addition to supporting auto-booting AUTORUN.SYS files, DOS XL's batch features provided an auto-booting batch feature. Naming a batch file to STARTUP.EXC would have it execute batch commands on startup (same as OS/A+). Unfortunately, this feature wasn't compatible with some programs (e.g. AtariWriter).

=== Distribution ===
DOS XL was distributed on a flippy disk with the single-density version on one side and double-density on the other. As more features and add-ons were included, these were placed on the double-density side only due to lack of disk space.

The manual for DOS XL was a subset of OS/A+. OSS considered the manual an "addendum" to OS/A+. Over 150+ pages, it was bound at the spine, not in loose-leaf form like the OS/A+ manual.

DOS XL came in two versions, 2.20 and 2.30 (2.20 users had to pay $20 to upgrade to 2.30). The last version was 2.30P. DOS XL originally sold for $30, but the price later increased to $39.

File writing verify was turned off in DOS XL. This was due to OSS's own experience that resulted in faster writes with virtually no risk of errors. The command file VERIFY.COM was included to reenable writes with verify. Atari DOS 2.0S by default verified file writes to disk.

Several disk drive manufacturers shipped DOS XL with their drives: Trak, Percom, Astra, Indus, Amdek, and Rana.

== Commands ==
=== Menu Commands ===
 C - Copy Files            P - Protect Files
 D - Duplicate Disk        Q - Quit to DOS XL
 E - Erase Files           R - Rename File
 F - Files on Disk         S - Save Binary
 G - Go to Address         T - To Cartridge
 I - Initialize Disk       U - Unprotect Files
 L - Load Binary           X - Xtended Command

=== Intrinsic Commands ===
- @ - Begins execution of a batch file
- CAR - Runs Cartridge
- Dn: - Changes default drive
- DIR - Directory
- END - Tells DOS XL to stop batch execution (used in a batch file)
- ERA - Erase file(s)
- LOA - Load file(s) in memory
- NOS - NO Screen. Turns off command echo to screen
- PRO - Protect. Enables write-protect on file(s)
- REM - REMark. Used for user remarks in batch files
- REN - REName. Renames file(s)
- RUN - Jumps to run address
- SAV - Saves a portion of memory to disk
- SCR - Enables commands to be echoed to screen (for batch files)
- TYP - Displays ASCII or ATASCII text files to screen
- UNP - Turns off write-protect on file(s)

=== Extrinsic Commands ===
- C65
- CLRDSK
- CONFIG
- COPY
- DO
- DUPDBL
- DUPDSK
- INIT
- INITDBL
- MAC65
- MENU
- NOVERIFY
- RS232
- RS232FIX
- SDCOPY
- VERIFY

=== BASIC Extended Commands ===
- CLOSE
- ENTER
- GET
- INPUT
- LIST
- LOAD
- NOTE
- OPEN
- POINT
- PRINT
- PUT
- SAVE
- PROTECT (XIO 35)
- UNPROTECT (XIO 36)
- RENAME (XIO 32)
- ERASE (XIO 33)

== Patch ==
Version 2.30p was a newer version to 2.30 to fix two problems.

- In previous versions of DOS XL, if you initialized a disk from the menu, the disk would not boot unless the file MENU.COM was on the disk. To alleviate this problem, type Q to quit the menu. Then type INIT or INITDBL from the command processor. Note: everything on the menu can be done manually from the command processor.
- If you have a multidrive system and you initialized a disk in a drive other than one, when booted, the disk will always come up with the number of the drive on which it was initialized. To prevent this problem, use D1: as the destination drive.

The patch for DOS XL 2.30 to make it a 2.30p:

OSS Disk Newsletter Fall 1986
Product News & Info
DOS XL - New-found Bugs
DOS XL Bugs and Fixes

BUG: The patch to convert version
2.30 to version 2.30p in our Spring
1984 newsletter didn't work.
FIX: Run the following program and
then use INIT with the "Write DOS.SYS
Only" option to write out the patched
DOS. Make sure that you don't have
DOSXL.SYS (either .SUP or .XL
version) active when you do this.

100 READ CNT:IF CNT=0 THEN END
110 READ START
120 FOR ADDR=START TO START+CNT-1
130 READ BYTE:POKE ADDR,BYTE
135 NEXT ADDR
140 GOTO 100
150 DATA 3,5481,32,1,21
160 DATA 29,5377,141,217,22,169,16
170 DATA 141,23,22,169,23,141,24,22
180 DATA 169,49,141,30,22,169,64,141
190 DATA 12,0,169,21,141,13,0,96
200 DATA 1,7425,112,0

BUG: INIT does not work if you use
drive numbers 4 through 8.
FIX: Run the following program:

10 OPEN #1,12,0,"D:INIT.COM"
20 FOR I=1 TO 116 : GET #1,C : NEXT I
30 PUT #1,ASC("9") : CLOSE #1

== Legacy ==
Plans for DOS XL 4 were scrapped due to low demand and competition. OSS reissued OS/A+ 4.1, mainly for double-sided support.

DOS XL, along with other OSS products, became part of ICD's catalog of Atari products in January 1988. However, DOS XL was dropped in favor of ICD's SpartaDOS.
