= Doss, Cass County, Texas =

Unincorporated community in Texas, US

Coordinates: 33.1319°N 94.5108°W

Doss is an unincorporated community in Cass County, Texas, United States, approximately 12 miles from Hughes Springs. It is located on Farm To Market Road 1399.
