= Disk operating system =

Operating system focused on disk-based file operations

A disk operating system (DOS) is a computer operating system that requires a hard disk (HDD), floppy disk, solid-state drive (SSD), or other direct-access storage device as secondary storage. A DOS provides a file system and a means for loading and running programs stored on the disk.

The term is now historical, as most if not all operating systems for general-purpose computers now require direct-access storage devices as secondary storage.

== History ==
Before modern storage such as hard disks, floppy disks, and flash storage, early computers used storage such as punched card, punched tape, magnetic tape, and magnetic drum. Early microcomputers and home computers used paper tape, audio cassette tape (such as Kansas City standard), or no permanent storage at all. Without permanent storage, programs and data are input directly into memory using front panel switches, or is input through a computer terminal or keyboard, sometimes controlled by a BASIC interpreter in ROM. When power is turned off, all information is lost.

In the early 1960s, as disk drives became larger and more affordable, various mainframe computer and minicomputer vendors introduced disk operating systems and modified existing operating systems to use disks.

Hard disks and floppy disks require software to manage rapid access to block storage of sequential and other data. For most microcomputers, a disk drive of any kind was an optional peripheral. Systems could be used with a tape drive or booted without a storage device at all. The disk operating system component of the operating system was only needed when a disk drive was used.

By the time IBM announced the System/360 mainframes, the concept of a disk operating system was well established. Although IBM did offer Basic Programming Support (BPS/360) and Tape Operating System/360 (TOS/360) for small systems, they were out of the mainstream and most customers used either DOS/360 or OS/360.

Most home and personal computers of the late 1970s and 1980s used a disk operating system, most often with "DOS" in the name and simply referred to as "DOS" in the context of its user community. For example, CBM DOS, Atari DOS, TRS-DOS, Apple DOS, Apple ProDOS, and MS-DOS. CP/M is also a disk operating system, despite not having "DOS" in the name.

A DOS is usually loaded from a disk, but there are exceptions, such as Commodore's disk drive for the Commodore 64 and VIC-20 which contain the DOS in read-only memory (ROM). Some versions of AmigaDOS mostly resides in ROM, as a part of an Amiga's Kickstart firmware.

== OS extensions ==
- Commodore DOS is on 8-bit Commodore computers such as the Commodore 64. Unlike most other DOS systems, it is integrated into the disk drives, not loaded into the computer's own memory.
- Atari DOS is used by the Atari 8-bit computers. The Atari OS only offers low-level disk-access, so an extra layer called DOS can be booted from a floppy for higher level functions such as filesystems. Third-party replacements for Atari DOS include DOS XL, SpartaDOS, MyDOS, TurboDOS, and Top-DOS.
- MSX-DOS is for the MSX computer standard. The initial version, released in 1984, is MS-DOS 1.0 ported to Z80. In 1988, version 2 has facilities such as subdirectories, memory management, and environment strings. The MSX-DOS kernel resides in ROM (built-in on the disk controller) so basic file access capacity is available even without the command interpreter, by using BASIC extended commands.
- Disc Filing System (DFS) is an optional component for the Acorn BBC Micro, as a kit with a disk controller chip, a ROM chip, and a few logic chips, to be installed inside the computer.
- Advanced Disc Filing System (ADFS) is a successor to Acorn's DFS.
- AMSDOS is for the Amstrad CPC computers.
- GDOS and G+DOS is for the +D and DISCiPLE disk interfaces for the ZX Spectrum.

== Main OSes ==
Some disk operating systems are the operating systems for the entire computer system.

- The Burroughs (now Unisys) Master Control Program (MCP) for the B5000 originally runs from a drum, but starting with the B5500 it runs from a disk. It is the basis for the MCP on the B6500, B7500, and successors.
- The SIPROS, Chippewa Operating System (COS), SCOPE, MACE and KRONOS operating systems on the Control Data Corporation (CDC) 6000 series and 7600 are all disk operating systems. KRONOS became NOS and SCOPE became NOS/BE.
- The GECOS operating system for the GE (later Honeywell and Groupe Bull) 600 family of mainframes (it later became GCOS).
- The IBM Basic Operating System/360 (BOS/360), Disk Operating System/360 (DOS/360) and Operating System/360 (OS/360) are standard for all but the smallest System/360 installations; the 360/67 also has Control Program-67 /Cambridge Monitor System (CP-67/CMS) and Time Sharing System/360 (TSS/360). BOS is gone, CP-67/CMS has evolved into z/VM, DOS has evolved into z/VSE, OS has evolved into z/OS and TSS/360 evolved into TSS/370 PRPQ, which is now gone.
- The EXEC II operating system for the UNIVAC 1107 and 1108, and the EXEC 8 operating system for the 1108, which has evolved into OS 2200 for the Unisys ClearPath Dorado Series.
- The DOS-11 operating system for DEC PDP-11 minicomputers.
- CP/M is a disk operating system, as the main or alternate operating system for numerous microcomputers of the 1970s and 1980s.
- Apple DOS is the primary operating system for the Apple II, from 1979 with the introduction of the floppy disk drive, until 1983 when it was replaced by ProDOS.
- TRSDOS is the operating system for the TRS-80 line of computers from Tandy.
- MS-DOS for IBM PC compatibles with Intel x86 CPUs. 86-DOS was modeled on CP/M, and then was adapted as the basis for Microsoft's MS-DOS. It was rebranded by IBM as PC DOS until 1993. Various compatible systems were later produced by different organizations, starting with DR-DOS in 1988.

== See also ==
- List of disk operating systems called DOS
- Live CD
