= Atari DOS =

- Atari DOS version 2.5, main menu
- Developer: Atari, Inc., Atari Corporation
- Working state: Discontinued
- Source model: Closed source
- Initial release: 1979; 47 years ago
- Latest release: XE 1.0 / 1987; 39 years ago
- Available in: English
- Supported platforms: Atari 8-bit computers
- Default user interface: Menu
- License: Proprietary EULA

Atari DOS is the disk operating system used with the Atari 8-bit computers. Operating system extensions loaded into memory were required in order for an Atari computer to manage files stored on a disk drive. These extensions to the operating system added the disk handler and other file management features.

The most important extension is the disk handler. In Atari DOS 2.0, this was the File Management System (FMS), an implementation of a file system loaded from a floppy disk. This meant at least an additional 32 KB RAM was needed to run with DOS loaded.

It is accessed by typing "DOS" at the BASIC or Assembler/Editor prompt to exit the cartridge, If DOS isn't loaded, on the 400 and 800, this exits to the memo pad, which is a text editor built into the firmware of those computers, or on XL and XE machines, the self test.

== Versions ==
There were several versions of Atari DOS available, with the first version released in 1979. Atari was using a cross assembler with Data General AOS.

=== DOS 1.0 ===
In the first version of DOS from Atari, all commands were only accessible from the menu. It was bundled with the Atari 810 disk drives. This version was entirely memory resident, which made it fast but occupied memory space.

=== DOS 2.0 ===
Also known as DISK OPERATING SYSTEM II VERSION 2.0S

The second, more popular version of DOS from Atari was bundled with the 810 disk drives and some early Atari 1050 disk drives. It is considered to be the lowest common denominator for Atari DOSes, as any Atari-compatible disk drive can read a disk formatted with DOS 2.0S.

DOS 2.0S consisted of DOS.SYS and DUP.SYS. DOS.SYS was loaded into memory, while DUP.SYS contained the disk utilities and was loaded only when the user exited to DOS.

In addition to bug fixes, DOS 2.0S featured improved NOTE/POINT support and the ability to automatically run an Atari executable file named AUTORUN.SYS. Since user memory was erased when DUP.SYS was loaded, an option to create a MEM.SAV file was added. This stored user memory in a temporary file (MEM.SAV) and restored it after DUP.SYS was unloaded. The previous menu option from DOS 1.0, N. DEFINE DEVICE, was replaced with N. CREATE MEM.SAV in DOS 2.0S.

Version 2.0S was for single-density disks, 2.0D was for double-density disks. 2.0D shipped with the 815 Dual Disk Drive, which was both expensive and incompatible with the standard 810, and thus sold only a small number; making DOS version 2.0D rare and unusual.

=== DOS 3 ===
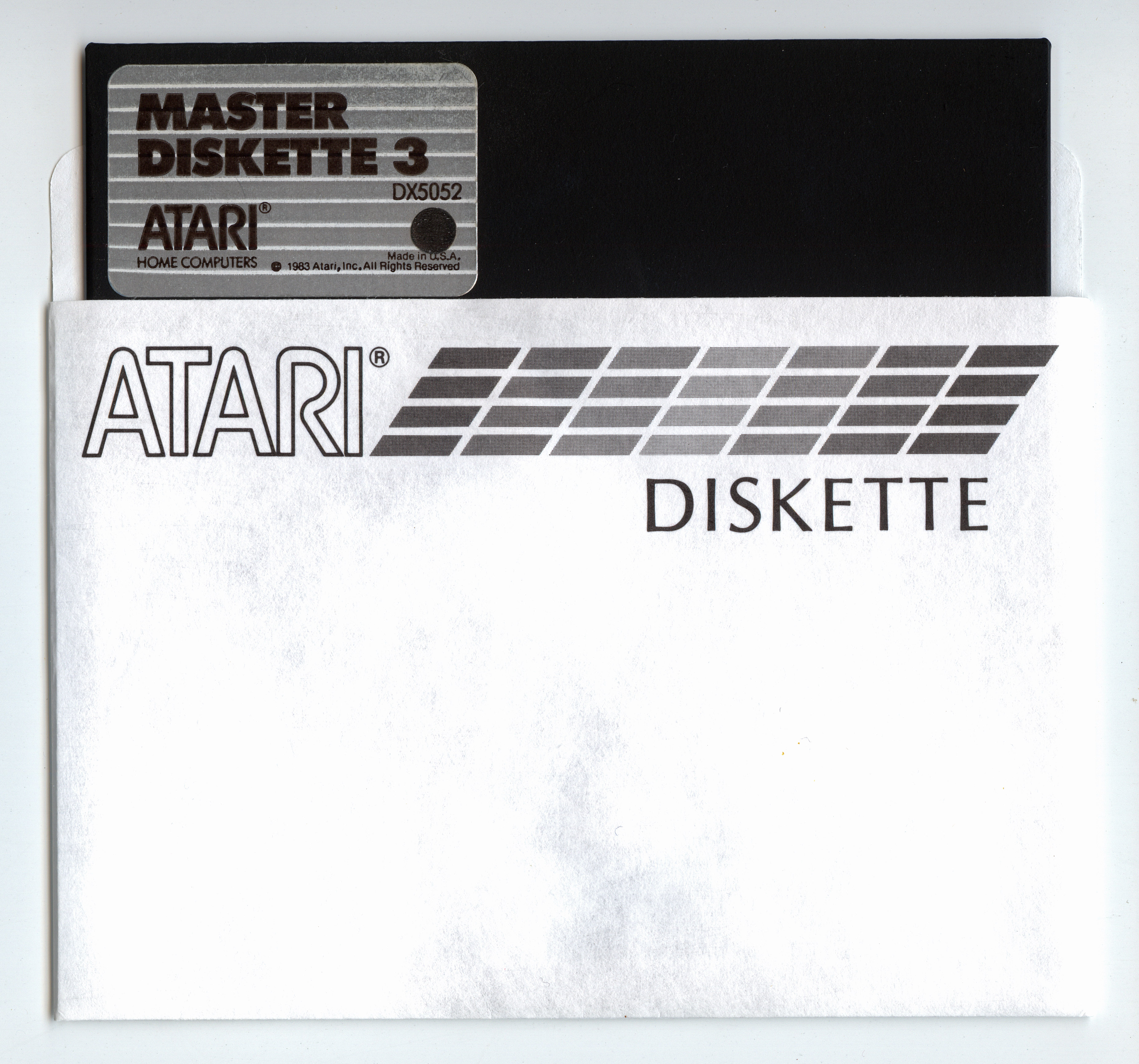
DOS 3 diskette as supplied with a 1050 disk drive

The 1050 was the first drive from Atari to offer higher recording density. For reasons unknown, they did not take advantage of the 180 kB "double density" mode the hardware in the 1050 was capable of using, and instead introduced a new "Dual Density" mode. To avoid confusion, Atari users soon began referring to this as Enhanced Density to differentiate it from real double density systems.

Initially, this increased density mode was not able to be used as Atari shipped the drives with 2.0, which only supported the original 90 kB mode. This was addressed not long after with the release of DOS 3.0. When formatted with DOS 3.0, the disk held 40 tracks of 26 sectors, up from 18 on DOS 2.0. Each sector holds 128 bytes, for a total of 133,120 bytes of storage, up from DOS 2.0's 92,160.

In DOS 2.0, a 10-bit number was used to store sector numbers in the directory. This limited disks to a maximum of 1024 sectors. The new format had 1040 sectors, so 2.0 would not be able to use all of its capability. To address this, and to offer the possibility of working with even larger formats in the future, DOS 3.0 grouped sectors together in groups of eight, known as a block, each holding 1,024 bytes. The number in the directory was reduced to 8-bits, meaning it could address up 256 kB on a single disk. The boot information and directory used three blocks, leaving 130 kB free for user storage on the 1050.

Unfortunately, the new directory format made the disks unreadable on DOS 2.0. The DOS 3.0 Master Diskette included a small utility program to copy a 2.0 disk to 3.0, but not one to copy it back. A separate utility allowed disks to be formatted in 2.0 format if compatibility was needed. As a result of this decision, DOS 3 was extremely unpopular and did not gain widespread acceptance amongst the Atari user community.

DOS 3 provided built-in help via the Atari HELP key and/or the inverse key. Help files needed to be present on the system DOS disk to function properly. DOS 3 also used special XIO commands to control disc operations within BASIC programs.

=== DOS 2.5 ===
Also known as DISK OPERATING SYSTEM II VERSION 2.5

Version 2.5 is an upgrade to 3.0. After listening to complaints by their customers, Atari released an improved version of their previous DOS. This allowed the use of Enhanced Density disks, and there was a utility to read DOS 3 disks. An additional option was added to the menu (P. FORMAT SINGLE) to format single-density disks. DOS 2.5 was shipped with 1050 disk drives and some early XF551 disk-drives.

Included utilities were DISKFIX.COM, COPY32.COM, SETUP.COM and RAMDISK.COM.

=== DOS 4.0 ===
Codename during production: QDOS

DOS 4.0 was designed for the 1450XLD. It was designed to operate with larger disk formats, adding double density and double sided support while also supporting the older single and enhanced density formats from DOS 2 and 2.5. To support the newer modes, it returned to the blocks concept used in DOS 3.0 when used to format enhanced or double density disks, but this time using slightly smaller 6-sector format, which held 768 bytes in enhanced density and 1536 bytes in double density.

Like DOS 3, disks formatted in the new higher-density formats were not compatible with older drives and DOSes. It could read and write to those disks to retain compatibility. However, it could not determine the format of a disk automatically, and the user had to select the format of the disks from the DOS menu.

The 1450XLD was never released, and the rights for DOS 4 were returned to the author, Michael Barall, who placed it in the public domain. It was published by Antic Software in 1984, and is sometimes referred to as "Antic DOS" for this reason.

=== DOS XE ===
Codename during production: ADOS

DOS XE supported the double-density and double-sided capabilities of the Atari XF551 drive, as well as its burst I/O. DOS XE used a new disk format which was incompatible with DOS 2.0S and DOS 2.5, requiring a separate utility for reading older 2.0 files. It also required bank-switched RAM, so it did not run on the 400/800 machines. It supported date-stamping of files and sub-directories.

DOS XE was the last DOS made by Atari for the Atari 8-bit computers.

== Third-party DOS programs ==
Many of these DOSes were released by manufacturers of third-party drives, anyone who made drive modifications, or anyone who was dissatisfied with the available DOSes. Often, these DOSes could read disks in higher densities, and could set the drive to read disks faster (using Warp Speed or Ultra-Speed techniques). Most of these DOSes (except SpartaDOS) were DOS 2.0 compatible.

=== SmartDOS ===
Menu driven DOS that was compatible with DOS 2.0. Among the first third-party DOS programs to support double-density drives.

Many enhancements including sector copying and verifying, speed checking, turning on/off file verifying and drive reconfiguration.

Published by Rana Systems. Written by John Chenoweth and Ron Bieber, last version 8.2D.

=== OS/A+ and DOS XL ===
DOS produced by Optimized Systems Software. Compatible with DOS 2.0 - Allowed the use of Double Density floppies. Unlike most ATARI DOSses, this used a command line instead of a menu. DOS XL provided a menu program in addition to the command line.

=== SuperDOS ===
This DOS could read SS/SD, SS/ED, SS/DD and DS/DD disks, and made use of all known methods of speeding up disk-reads supported by the various third-party drive manufacturers.

Published by Technical Support. Written by Paul Nicholls.

=== Top-DOS ===
Menu driven DOS with enhanced features. Sorts disk directory listings and can set display options. File directory can be compressed. Can display deleted files and undelete them. Some advanced features required a proprietary TOP-DOS format.

Published by Eclipse Software. Written by R. K. Bennett.

=== Turbo-DOS ===
This DOS supports Turbo 1050, Happy, Speedy, XF551 and US Doubler highspeed drives. XL/XE only.

Published by Martin Reitershan Computertechnik. Written by Herbert Barth and Frank Bruchhäuser.

=== MyDOS ===
This DOS adds the ability to use sub-directories, and supports hard-drives.

Published by Wordmark Systems, includes complete source code under copyleft license, with an exception on distributing commercially only if it included in software or derived software made of it would cost less than $50.

There are a number of free addons and extensions for MyDOS created by users.

==== MyPicoDOS ====
This is a fork of MyDOS, intended to be used as game launcher.

=== SpartaDOS ===
This DOS used a command-line interface. It was not compatible with DOS 2.0, but could read DOS 2.0 disks. It supports subdirectories and hard drives and is capable of handling filesystems sized up to 16 MB. Included the capability to create primitive batch files.

==== SpartaDOS X ====
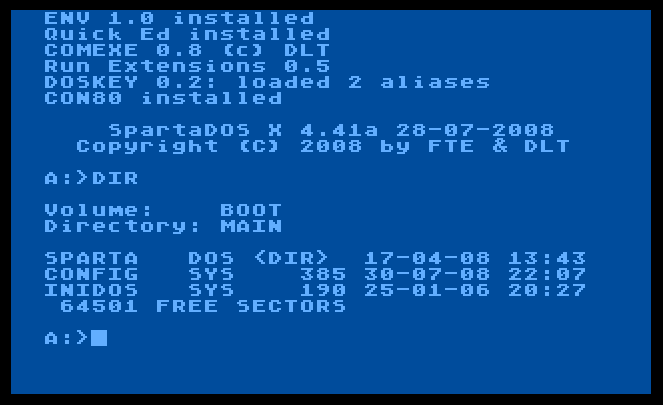
Screenshot of SpartaDOS X by FTE & DLT

A more sophisticated version of SpartaDOS, which strongly resembles MS-DOS in its look and feel. It was shipped on a 64 KB ROM cartridge.

==== RealDOS ====
A SpartaDOS compatible DOS (in fact, a renamed version of SpartaDOS 3.x, for legal reasons).

RealDOS is shareware by Stephen J. Carden and Ken Ames.

=== BW-DOS ===
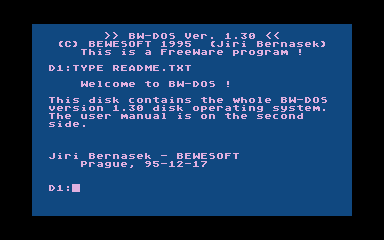
Screenshot of BW-DOS by Jiří Bernasek

A SpartaDOS compatible DOS. It has a much lower memory footprint compared to the original SpartaDOS and does not use the RAM under the ROM of XL/XE machines, allowing it to be used on the older Atari 400/800 models.

BW-DOS is freeware by Jiří Bernasek. The last version 1.30 was released in December 1995.

Since then, Holger Janz has worked with Jiří Bernasek to release BW-DOS 1.4, and in January 2025, BW-DOS 1.5 was released.

=== XDOS ===
XDOS is freeware by Stefan Dorndorf.

=== LiteDOS ===
Minimalistic DOS for Atari, supporting files formats of various other systems, such as files of Atari DOS and MyDOS. Freeware by Sijmen Schouten.

== Disk formats ==
A number of different formats existed for Atari disks. Atari DOS 2.0S, single-sided, single-density disk had 720 sectors divided into 40 tracks. After formatting, 707 sectors were free. Each 128-byte sector used the last 3 bytes for housekeeping data (bytes used, file number, next sector), leaving 125 bytes for data. This meant each disk held 707 × 125 = 88,375 bytes of user data.

The single-density disk holding a mere 88 KB per side remained the most popular Atari 8-bit disk format throughout the series' lifetime, and almost all commercial software continued to be sold in that format (or variants of it modified for copy protection), since it was compatible with all Atari-made disk drives.

- Single-Sided, Single-Density: 40 tracks with 18 sectors per track, 128 bytes per sector. 720 sectors, 90 KB capacity.
- Single-Sided, Enhanced-Density: 40 tracks with 26 sectors per track, 128 bytes per sector. 1040 sectors, 130 KB capacity. Readable by the 1050 and the XF551.
- Single-Sided, Double-Density: 40 tracks with 18 sectors per track, 256 bytes per sector. 720 sectors, 180 KB capacity. Readable by the XF551, the 815, or modified/upgraded 1050.
- Double-Sided, Double-Density: 80 tracks (40 tracks per side) with 18 sectors per track, 256 bytes per sector. 1440 sectors (720 sectors per side), 360 KB capacity. Readable by the XF551 only.

=== Percom standard ===
In 1978, Percom established a double-density layout standard which all other manufacturers of Atari-compatible disk drives such as Indus, Amdek, and Rana —except Atari itself— followed. A configuration block of 12 bytes defines the disk layout.

=== RAMCART ===
It is ramdisk for Atari XL, compatible with many DOS software.

=== IDE Plus 2.0 ===
It is a utility to work with Atari disks and diskettes, based on MyDOS and SpartaDOS.
