= Dos =

Dos or DOS may refer to:

== Computing ==
- Disk operating system
  - List of disk operating systems called DOS
  - DOS, common shorthand for MS-DOS and compatible operating systems
- Data over signalling (DoS), multiplexing data onto a signalling channel
- Denial-of-service attack (DoS attack), a cyberattack

== Music ==
- dos (band), an American rock duo
  - Dos (Dos album), 1986
- Dos (Altered State album), 1993
- Dos (Fanny Lú album), 2008
- Dos, a 1992 album by Gerardo
- ¡Dos!, a 2012 album by Green Day
- Dos (Malo album), 1972
- Dos (Myriam Hernández album), 1990
- Dos, a 2009b album by Wooden Shjips
- DOS (concert), by Daniel Padilla, 2014

== Organisations ==
- Democratic Opposition of Serbia, a former political alliance
- Department of Space, an Indian government department
- Directorate of Overseas Surveys, now Ordnance Survey International, in the UK
- Dominus Obsequious Sororium, a cult of NXIVM formed by Keith Raniere
- United States Department of State

== Science and technology ==
- Density of states, in condensed matter physics
- DOS, a series of Russian space stations in the Salyut programme
- Dioctyl sebacate, an organic chemical
- Diversity oriented synthesis, in chemistry

== Sports ==
- DOS Kampen, a Dutch football club
- VV DOS, a past Dutch football club now part of FC Utrecht

== Other uses ==
- Dos (card game), a variation of Uno
- Dos, an Ancient Roman dowry
- Dos, a village in Vidra Commune, Romania
- Day of Silence, an LGBT observance

== See also ==
- American Descendants of Slavery (ADOS)
- Doss (disambiguation)
- Do (disambiguation), for the singular of dos
- Uno, dos, tres (disambiguation)
