= SWEET16 =

Interpreted byte-code instruction set

SWEET16 is an interpreted byte-code instruction set invented by Steve Wozniak and implemented as part of the Integer BASIC ROM in the Apple II computers. It was created because Wozniak needed to manipulate 16-bit pointer data, and the Apple II was an 8-bit computer.

SWEET16 was not used by the core BASIC code, but was later used to implement several utilities. Notable among these was the line renumbering routine, which was included in the Programmer's Aid #1 ROM, added to later Apple II models and available for user installation on earlier examples.

SWEET16 code is executed as if it were running on a 16-bit processor with sixteen internal 16-bit little-endian registers, named R0 through R15. Some registers have well-defined functions:

- R0 – accumulator
- R12 – subroutine stack pointer
- R13 – stores the result of all comparison operations for branch testing
- R14 – status register
- R15 – program counter

The 16 virtual registers, 32 bytes in total, are located in the zero page of the Apple II's real, physical memory map (at $00–$1F), with values stored as low byte followed by high byte. The SWEET16 interpreter itself is located from $F689 to $F7FC in the Integer BASIC ROM.

According to Wozniak, the SWEET16 implementation is a model of frugal coding, taking up only about 300 bytes in memory. SWEET16 runs at about one-tenth the speed of the equivalent native 6502 code; however it shaved around 20% off the size of Integer BASIC.

== Operations ==
Register Ops			Nonregister Ops		
			00	RTN	Return to 6502 mode
1n	SET Rn	Constant set	01	BR ea	Branch always
2n	LD Rn	Load	02	BNC ea	Branch if No Carry
3n	ST Rn	Store	03	BC ea	Branch if Carry
4n	LD @Rn	Load indirect	04	BP ea	Branch if Plus
5n	ST @Rn	Store indirect	05	BM ea	Branch if Minus
6n	LDD @Rn	Load double-byte indirect	06	BZ ea	Branch if Zero
7n	STD @Rn	Store double-byte indirect	07	BNZ ea	Branch if NonZero
8n	POP @Rn	Pop indirect	08	BM1 ea	Branch if Minus 1
9n	STP @Rn	Store Pop indirect	09	BNM1 ea	Branch if Not Minus 1
An	ADD Rn	Add	0A	BK	Break
Bn	SUB Rn	Subtract	0B	RS	Return from Subroutine
Cn	POPD @Rn	Pop double-byte indirect	0C	BS ea	Branch to Subroutine
Dn	CPR Rn	Compare	0D	Unassigned	
En	INR Rn	Increment	0E	Unassigned	
Fn	DCR Rn	Decrement	0F	Unassigned	
