= 1055 (disambiguation) =

1055 may refer to:

- 1055, a number in the 1000s range
- AD 1055 (MLV), a year in the Common Era
- 1055 BC, a year Before the Common Era

== Roads ==
- A1055 road (Great Britain)
- Louisiana Highway 1055 in Louisiana, US
- Farm to Market Road 1055 in Texas, US

== Naval vessels ==
- German submarine U-1055, a World War II German U-boat
- USS Hepburn (DE-1055), a U.S. Navy Cold War frigate
- USS Tech III (SP-1055), a World War I U.S. Navy patrol boat

== Other uses ==
- Atari 1055, a floppy drive unit
- 1055 Tynka, a main belt asteroid, the 1055th asteroid registered

== See also ==
- MLV (disambiguation)
- 105 (disambiguation)
