= Atari XF551 =

Floppy disk drive

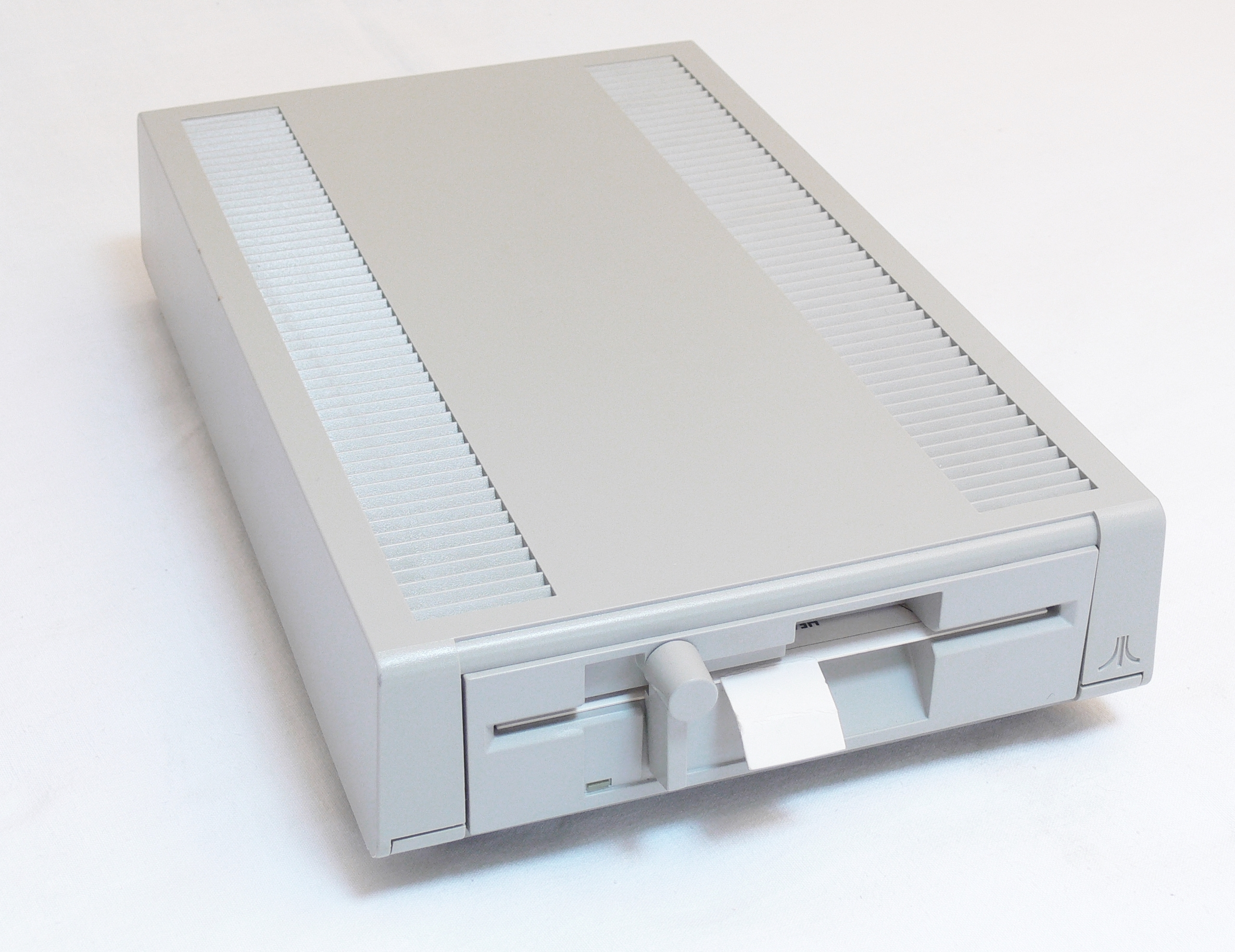
The XF551 matches the grey styling of the XE series machines and the Atari ST.

The XF551 is a 5 1/4 inch floppy disk drive produced by Atari, Inc. for the Atari 8-bit computers. Introduced in 1987, it matches the gray design language of the XE models. It was the first drive from the company with official support for double-density and double-sided floppy disks—360 kB of storage per disk—and was also the final floppy disk drive Atari produced for the 8-bit computers. The XF551 allows faster transfer speed when used in double-density mode, doubling performance.

Although an XE-styled drive was shown several times during 1985 and 1986, production waited while leftover inventories of the Atari 1050 were sold off. By the time these ran out late in 1986, interest in the 8-bit line had waned and a new model was not put into production. At the same time, the success of the Nintendo Entertainment System (NES) prompted Atari to repackage their 65XE as the Atari XEGS video game console, boasting it could be expanded to a complete computer with the addition of a keyboard and disk drive. Nintendo sued, noting that Atari had no disk drives to sell, forcing Atari to rush the drive to market in June 1987 even though the software was not ready.

The XF551 is generally considered the best of Atari's drive offerings; not only does it store three times as much data as the 1050, it is twice as fast and almost silent in operation. Its release was marred by packaging it with an old version of Atari DOS which does not support the new features. This was addressed with DOS XE a year later. Support was dropped, along with the entire 8-bit computer line, in 1992.

== History ==
=== Earlier drives ===
When the Atari 8-bit computers began shipping in 1979, Atari showed two floppy disk drive systems, the 810 and the 815. The 810 used the then-standard single-density FM encoding format that stored about 90 kB of data, while the 815 packaged two drives in a single case, both supporting a double-density MFM encoding format of 180 kB. Small numbers of the 815 began shipping in June 1980, but mass production never started. Nevertheless, this brief introduction set the standard for double-density drives that other companies would later support.

During the introduction of the Atari 1200XL in 1982, the company introduced a new line of peripherals matching the styling of the new machine. This included the Atari 1050, a new disk drive that was built around the double-density MFM encoding standard that provided up to 180 kB of storage. For reasons unknown, Atari's DOS for the machine did not support the double-density format, instead it used a new format known alternately as "enhanced density" or "dual density" with 130 kB. Several 3rd party DOS products emerged that fully supported double-density, as well as new drives like the Indus GT that offered double-density from the start, along with additional features and improved performance.

=== Turmoil at Atari ===
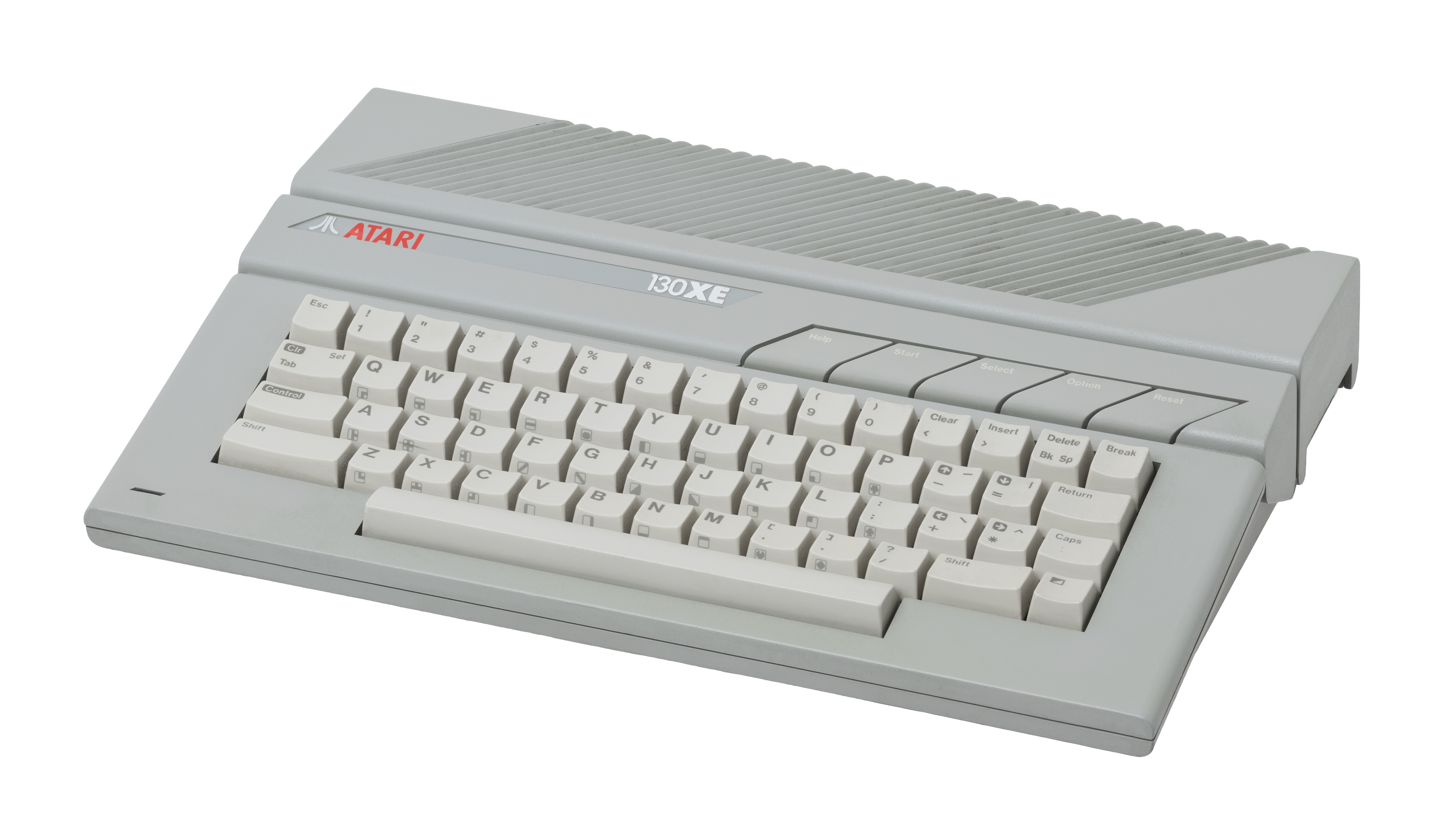
The 130XE and similar 65XE were cost-reduced versions of the 8-bit line that could be produced at price points similar to the Commodore 64.

In 1983, Commodore International sparked off a price war in the home computer market by repeatedly lowering the price of its VIC-20 and Commodore 64 (C64) lines in order to undercut the TI-99/4A. Atari had recently introduced the 1200XL at a higher price point, and its lineup could not be produced profitably at the rapidly falling market prices. Atari eventually introduced lower-cost models, the 600XL and 800XL, but these were repeatedly delayed and did not reach market until late in 1983, too late to have an impact. Combined with the effects of the video game crash of 1983, the company was soon losing over a million dollars a day.

The success of the C64 did not save Commodore from problems of its own. In January 1984, Commodore president Jack Tramiel got into some sort of argument with chairman of the board, Irving Gould, and left the company. After spending some time looking for ways to re-enter the field, in July he arranged a deal to buy Atari from its owners, Warner Communications, for no cash and several million in promissory notes.

Attempting to bring the company back to some semblance of profitability, the new management laid off whole divisions while working to bring their new Atari ST, to market as soon as possible. During this period many advanced projects within the company were cancelled. This included Atari's own 32-bit efforts and several advanced game consoles. Warehouses filled with stocks of the 8-bit line were sold off at fire-sale prices pending the introduction of cost-reduced models, the XE series.

=== XF521 ===
Atari had already been working on several upgrades to the 1050 series, including the 1050CR, for cost-reduced. This replaced the original custom MOS 6507-based interface card with one using the Intel 8048 microcontroller. The 8048 included internal RAM and ROM and thus greatly simplified the overall design of the interface. The Tramiels took the CR and repackaged it to match the silver-grey styling of the XE and ST line. While introducing the XE's at the January 1985 Consumer Electronics Show, the company previewed the design as the XF521. It was rumored it would also support true double-density mode.

When the Tramiels took over the company they found huge stocks of unsold 1050s, and repeatedly delayed the XF521 while selling these off. By the time the stocks of these drives finally dwindled in 1986, the ST was selling strongly and the company had lost interest in the 8-bit line. Any mention of the XF521 disappeared.

=== Nintendo sues ===
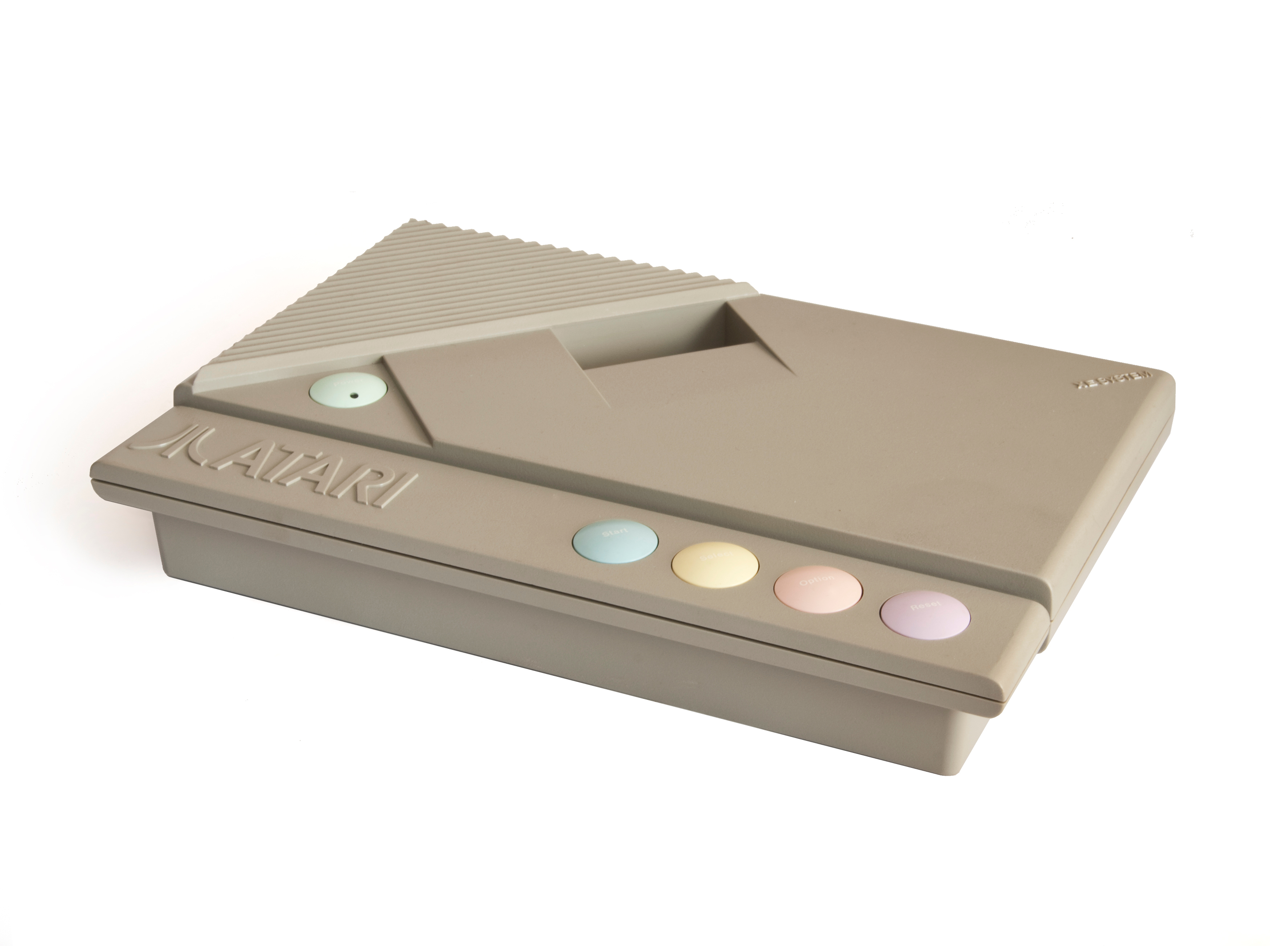
The XEGS was a repackaged 65XE, supplied with a separate keyboard that allowed it to be used as a complete computer.

In October 1985, Nintendo introduced the Nintendo Entertainment System to North America. By late 1986 it was a runaway success, prompting the Tramiels to reexamine the games console market. At the time, Atari had warehouses of the Atari 5200 and Atari 7800 which were put back on the market, but neither had been in production for some time and were built on pre-XE systems with no capability to produce more. This led to the decision to introduce a new console, the Atari XEGS, which was essentially a repackaged Atari 65XE and would run existing 8-bit games.

As part of the XEGS launch, Atari boasted about its large library of software as well as its ability to be used as a true computer with the supplied keyboard and optional peripherals including a floppy drive. By this point, stocks of the 1050 had already run out. This led to about six months where no official Atari drives were available for the line, and it appeared the company was in no hurry to introduce the XF521.

Nintendo sued Atari for false advertising, noting that Atari claimed the system supported a floppy but did not actually have drives for sale.

=== Redesign ===
At some point during this period, Atari decided to completely redesign the drive. The computer market was already well into the conversion from 5.25 to 3.5-inch disks, and 5.25 double-density double-sided drives were now commonplace and inexpensive. Moreover, after the introduction of the IBM PC, drives using the standard 34-bit ribbon cable had proliferated. This allowed internal mechanisms to be easily swapped.

Earlier Atari drives used a customized controller that communicated with the host computer's Atari SIO bus using a MOS 6507 running at 500 kHz. For historical reasons, these drives used a 19.2 kbps speed to transfer data, although this was not a limitation of the bus itself. Third party drives normally used higher speeds, when run with suitable third-party DOSes, with some operating as high as the 52 kbps "Warp Speed" of the Happy 810. For the new drive, Atari decided to double the rate to 38 kbps, although only when used with double-density disks.

Atari DOS 2.5, introduced for the 1050 in 1983, did not support either capability. This had led to a thriving market for 3rd party DOSes which had long supported double-density modes and the higher transfer speeds. Among these was DOS XL, introduced in 1983 by Optimized Systems Software (OSS), authors of the original Atari DOS. Atari contracted OSS to produce a new version, initially known as ADOS, which added double-sided support to its existing double-density and high-speed features.

=== Introduction ===
Prior to the Nintendo lawsuit, Atari claimed the only holdup on the new drive was that the documentation for the new DOS was not ready. When the lawsuit was launched, Atari put the drive on the market immediately in June 1987, shipping it with the existing Atari DOS 2.5. This was a success, as it did result in the lawsuit being dropped.

However, DOS 2.5 lacked support for the new modes, which essentially made it a direct replacement for the 1050 rather than the major upgrade it was intended to be. DOS XE did not ship until 1988/89, by which time the same modes were already supported by a variety of 3rd party solutions like SpartaDOS. Nevertheless, shipping DOS 2.5 with the drives for over a year led to significant confusion in the market.

The drive was otherwise very well received. It was "eerily silent during operation", so much so that reviews noted it was impossible to tell if it was being used without looking at the access LED. The only real complaints were the rear position of the power button, which made it difficult to access in some computer desks, and that it was very "fussy" about the diskettes, rejecting as many as 20% of low-cost floppies. (Note: It was speculated at the time that the dual heads on the drive pressed too tightly on the disk.) In the end, it was "heartily recommend"ed, and "the best thing that's happened to Atari's 8-bit computer line since the birth of the 130XE".

By the late 1980s, sales of the XE series were primarily to low-cost markets like eastern Europe and South America. These markets were so cost-sensitive that even the low price of the XF551 was too much for most users, and the most common storage mechanism was the XC12 cassette tape system. The entire 8-bit series was eventually discontinued in 1992.

== Description ==
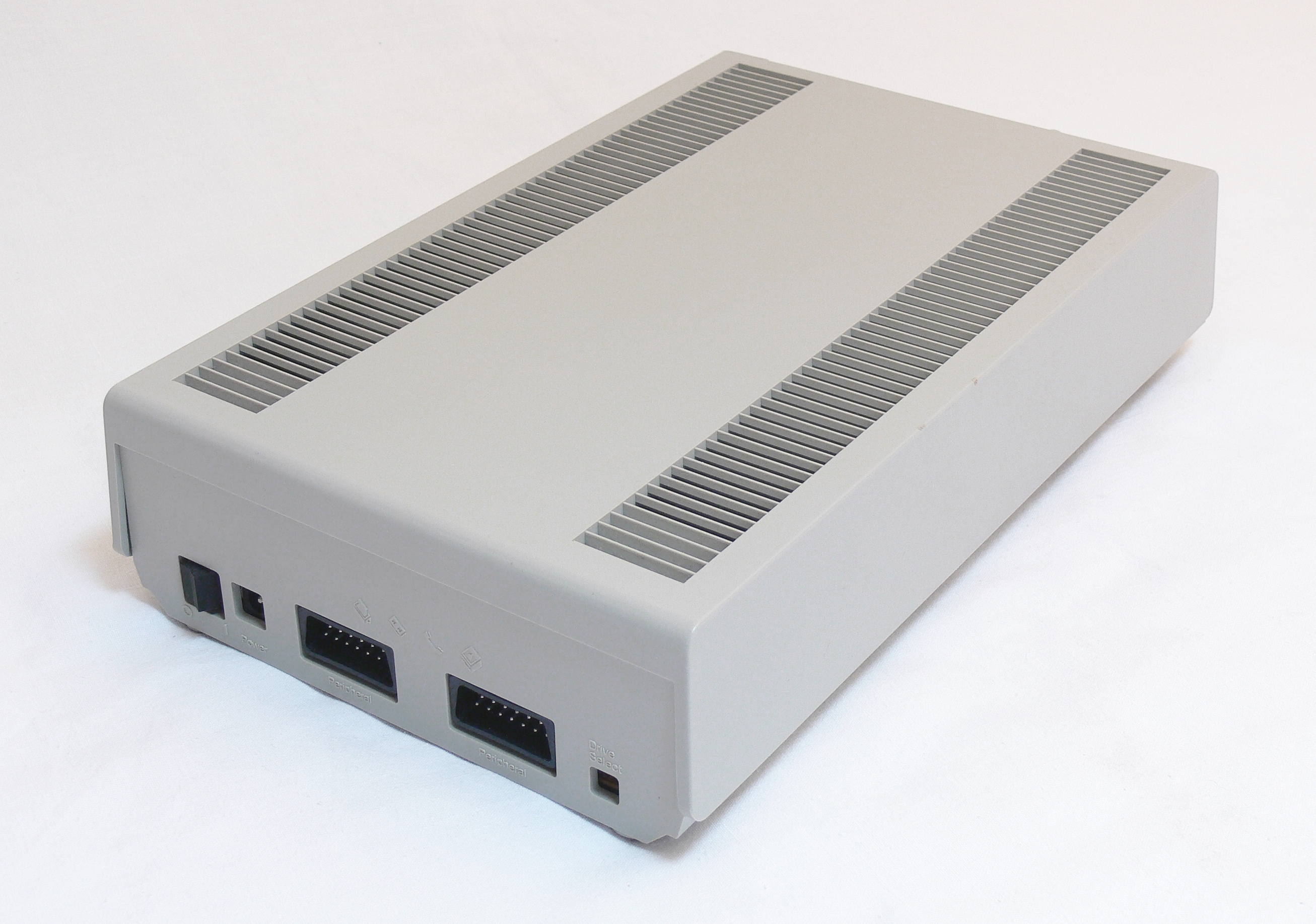
The rear panel of the XF551 held (from left to right) a power switch, the jack for the external power supply, the two SIO ports and the small DIP switches for selecting the drive number.

The XF551 was slightly smaller than the 1050 it replaced, but overall similar. It connected to the computer or XEGS using the SIO port, with two ports on the back, in and out, to allow it to be daisy chained to other peripherals. The back also had the jack for the power supply, the power switch, and a DIP switch that allowed the drive to be numbered 1 through 4.

When operating in legacy modes to read or write to disks from the 810 or 1050, the system transferred data at the original standard speed of 19,040 bps. This speed was much lower than the SIO was capable of, and had been selected simply because that was the limit of the logic analyzer available to the engineers designing the original 810s. The XF551, when operating in double-density mode, doubled this to 38,908 bps.

SIO is a serial bus that sends commands and data over the same in and out pins. This requires the devices on the SIO to be "smart", listening for commands being sent to their device number, decoding the instructions, and responding in kind. In previous Atari drives, this had been accomplished with the 6507, a cut-down version of the MOS 6502 that was being used in the Atari VCS console. The console ran at 1.1 MHz, but some 6507s supplied by Synertek failed to run at this speed reliably and were passed off to be used as SIO controllers running at lower speeds.

For the new drive, which operated at higher speeds and had more features, the 6507 was replaced by the Intel 8040, microcontrollers that included ROM and RAM on the same chip and thus allowed a great simplification of the controller. The 8040 versions did not have enough ROM for the entire driver, so later models moved to the 8050 with 4 kB for a further simplification. These chips, originally introduced in 1976, were now available for pennies and ran at a relatively fast 8.33 MHz. The controller was paired with the then-standard Western Digital FD1772 floppy disk controller, a late-model version of WD's drive controllers that implemented almost all of the required circuitry in a single 28-pin chip and thereby lowered the total cost of implementation.

Previous to the XF551, users would generally use both sides of a floppy disk by formatting one side, flipping the disk over, and formatting the second, the so-called "flippy disk". This presented a potential problem with the new drive; if a user flipped the disk and formatted using the default double-sided format, any data on the other side would be erased. To prevent this, the system only allowed formatting if the disk's timing hole was in the correct "up" position, otherwise it would only format in the older single-sided formats. For those that needed to make flippys for use with other drives, the XF551 Enhancer appeared, a modification that allowed the drive to ignore the timing hole and write to either side of the disk.

Most of the drives sold used a Mitsumi Electric mechanism, although a small number of later models replaced this with one from Chinon Industries. They can be distinguished as the Mitsumi version has a rectangular LED on the front while the Chinon version is round. The Chinon versions also used the timing hole for both formatting and reading, and thus could not work with flippy disks at all. This limitation could be removed with the Enhancer. Because the drive mechanism was connected to the board using a standard connector, it was possible to replace it with a 3.5-inch mechanism, and this became quite popular.

In contrast to the 810 and 1050, which ran at the non-standard speed of 288 RPM, the XF551 ran at the industry standard 300 RPM. This caused problems for a small number of programs whose copy protection relied on accurately timing the drive.

One design feature of DOS XE was that it always wrote files to side one of the floppy until it ran out of room. This meant the disks could be inserted in older drives also being run with DOS XE, or compatible double-density 3rd party DOSes, and at least read the files on that side.
