= Atari 8-bit computer peripherals =

Atari-related hardware

Atari 8-bit computer peripherals include floppy drives, printers, modems, and video game controllers for Atari 8-bit computers, which includes the 400/800, XL, XE, and XEGS. Some peripherals require separate software, which was usually bundled on cartridge or floppy disk.

Because the Atari 400/800 8-bit computers were bundled with an RF modulator, stringent FCC regulations limiting radio emissions applied. Consequently, the Atari 400/800 systems internal construction use large metal frames as Faraday cages to prevent emissions. This prevents the use of internal cards to add connections for peripherals.

To permit easy expansion, Atari developed the SIO (Serial Input/Output) bus. This bus daisy chains together all Atari peripherals into a single string. The Atari computer family was designed to be easy for novice users to expand, with one universal connector plug. Peripherals have their own IDs and can deliver downloadable drivers to the computer during the boot process. However, the additional electronics in these "intelligent" peripherals made them cost more than the "dumb" devices for other systems.

== List of peripherals ==
The names and the styling of Atari's 8-bit peripherals generally match the contemporary computer family. Thus, they can be divided into one of three groups: the 400/800 era (4xx/8xx), the XL era (10xx), and the XE era (beginning with 'X'). The XL-era naming reflects Atari's original intention to launch an "Atari 1000" line. These are superficial issues and the majority of peripherals are compatible with any 8-bit Atari computer.

Atari failed to release a large selection of machines and peripherals that were otherwise completed.

=== 400/800 era (1979-1982) ===
- 410 Program Recorder - a tape drive, 600 bit/s on compact cassettes
  - There are several variants of the 410. Early models were sizeable due largely to a much bigger speaker area at the back, and had square cornered buttons. Later versions were smaller and had buttons that were rounded off on the front.
  - The 410 used stereo with the data recorded on one track and the other track holding audio that could be fed through the 400 or 800's sound output (as demonstrated by the language courses). The tape could also be programmatically stopped and started, provided the 'Play' button was engaged.
- 810 Disk Drive - a 5¼" floppy disk drive, single-density single-sided, 90 KB
  - Pre-1982 drives "have notoriously poor speed regulation", ANALOG Computing reported in 1983; unlike other companies, "ATARI did not begin incorporating a reliable separator into the 810 until early 1982".
- 820 40-Column Printer - dot matrix on adding machine paper
- 822 Thermal Printer - 40-column thermal on slightly wider paper
- 825 80-Column Printer - dot matrix, used the Centronics interface so required an 850 (repackaged Centronics 737)
- 830 Acoustic Modem - a 300-baud modem, using an acoustic coupler, used RS-232 so required an 850 (relabelled Novation CAT). This came with a cartridge called Telelink which enabled you to connect to online services like Compuserve and The Source.
- 835 Direct Connect Modem - a 300-baud modem, direct connect, basic Hayes compatible with SIO interface, unlike the 830 modem, this doesn't require the 850 so it can connect via the SIO interface directly to the computer. This came with an updated version of Telelink which added support for this peripheral.
- 850 Interface Module - included four RS-232 ports and one Centronics parallel port. It was usually used for modems.
- CX30 Paddle Controllers - a set of 2 potentiometers attached to a single Atari joystick port. Originally released with the Atari VCS console.
- CX40 joystick - 8-directional 1-button joystick, originally released with the Atari VCS console. Bundled with some Atari 400/800 packages and also sold separately. Originally all-black, a version with a matching gray base was later bundled with the Atari XEGS.
- CX70 Light Pen - a light pen. Bundled with demonstration software on cassette
- CX85 Numerical Keypad - external keypad that plugs into the joystick ports.

==== Prototypes and vaporware ====
- 815 Dual Disk Drive - dual 5¼" floppy disks, double-density single-sided, 180 KB (only small number of prototypes produced)
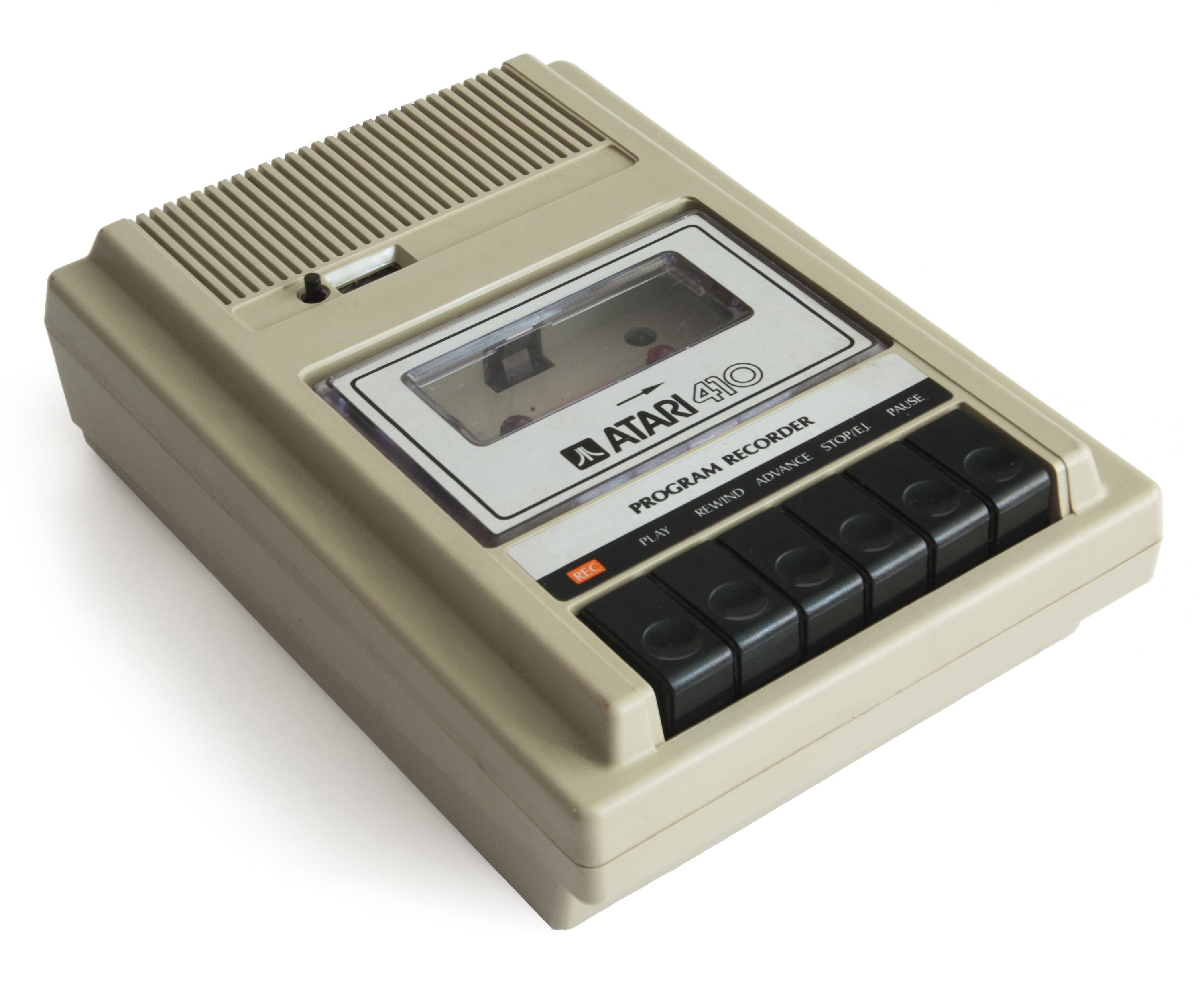
410 Tape Drive (later version)

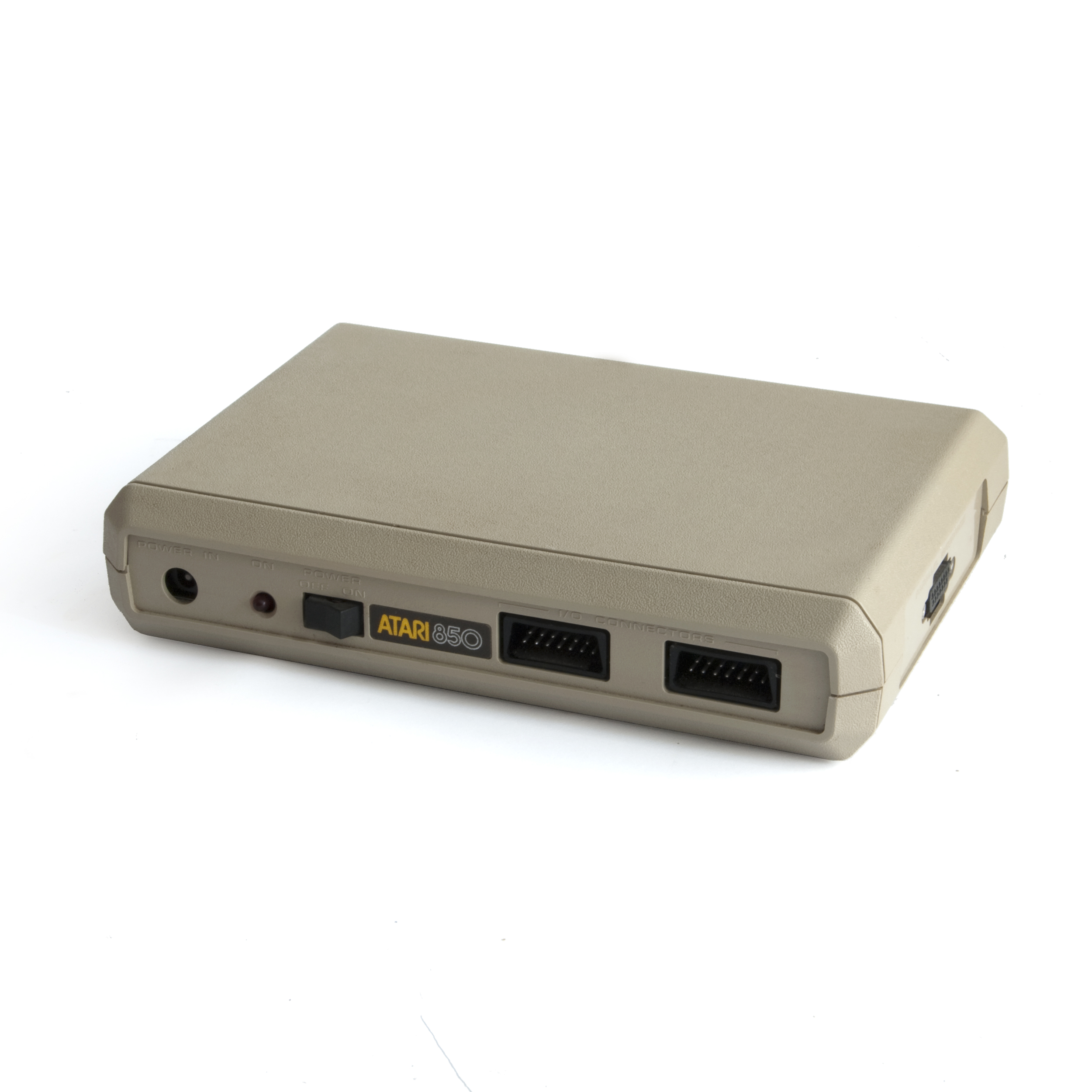
850 Expansion System

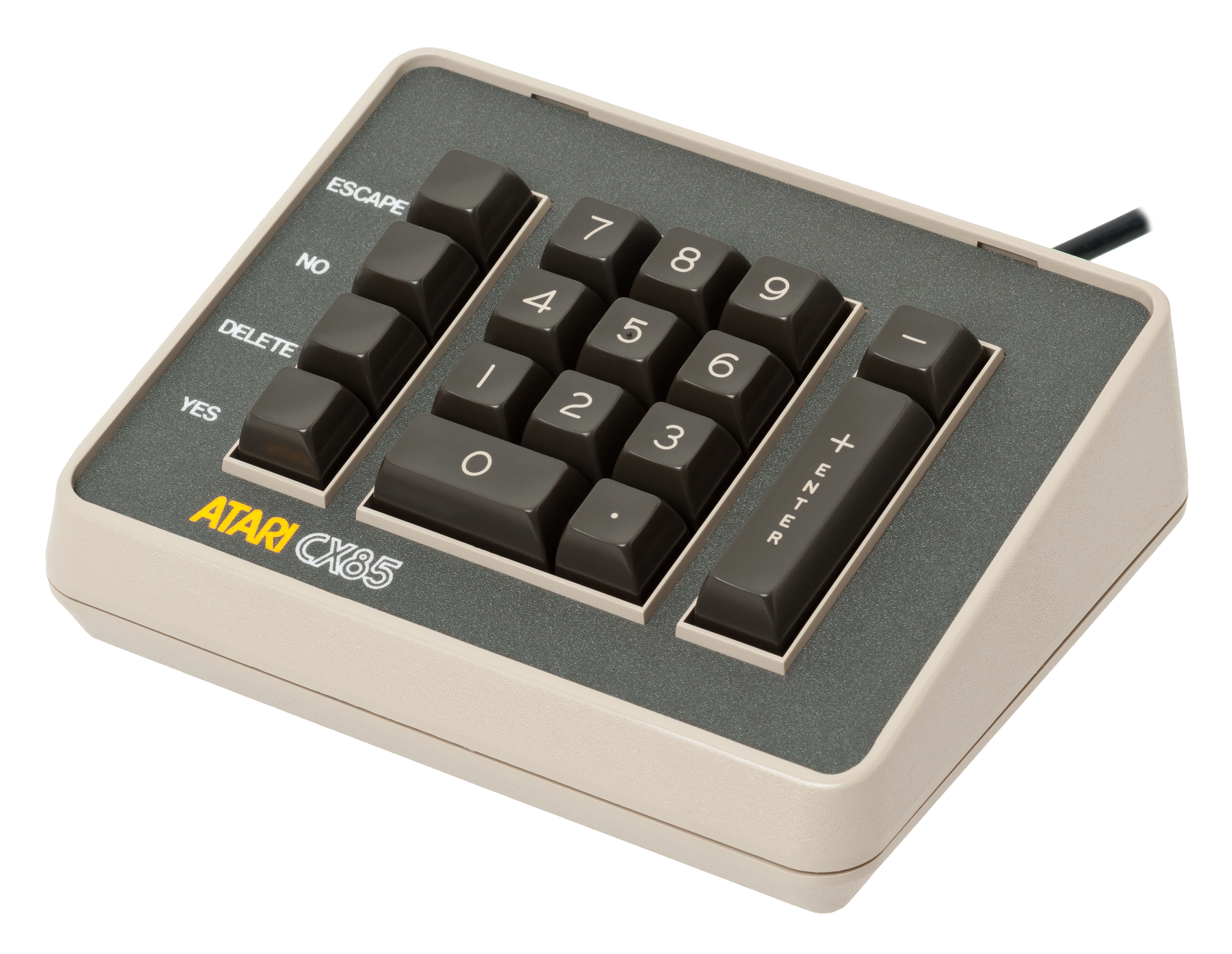
Atari CX85

=== XL era (1982-1984) ===
- 1010 Program Recorder - a tape drive, a smaller replacement for the 410
- 1020 Color Printer - a 40-column plotter with 4 pens
- 1025 Printer - 80-column dot matrix (OEM Okidata ML-80)
- 1027 Letter Quality Printer - 80-column letter quality that printed with a 5-wheels-on-a-drum system kept inked by a top-mounted roller (OEM Mannesmann Tally Riteman LQ)
- 1029 Programmable Printer - 80-column lower-quality 7-pin dot matrix sold in Europe (Seikosha mechanism)
- 1030 Modem - 300 baud, direct connect with communications software built into the firmware called Modemlink. This is the only Atari modem that doesn't require separate software.
- 1050 Dual-Density Disk Drive - 5¼" floppy disk, "enhanced density" format single-sided, 130 KB
- 1064 Memory Module - 64 KB memory expansion for 600XL
- CX75 Light Pen - a light pen. Bundled with the AtariGraphics drawing program on cartridge.
- CX77 Touch Tablet - a graphics tablet. Bundled with the AtariArtist drawing program on cartridge.
- CX80 Trak-Ball Controller - a trackball, also contains a switch for joystick emulation

==== Prototypes and vaporware ====
- 1053 - a 5¼" floppy drive, looks like a 1050 but double-sided double-density, 360 KB
- 1055 - a 3½" floppy drive, single-side enhanced-density
- 1090 XL Expansion System - a case connected to the PBI port, with 5 slots intended for various expansion cards
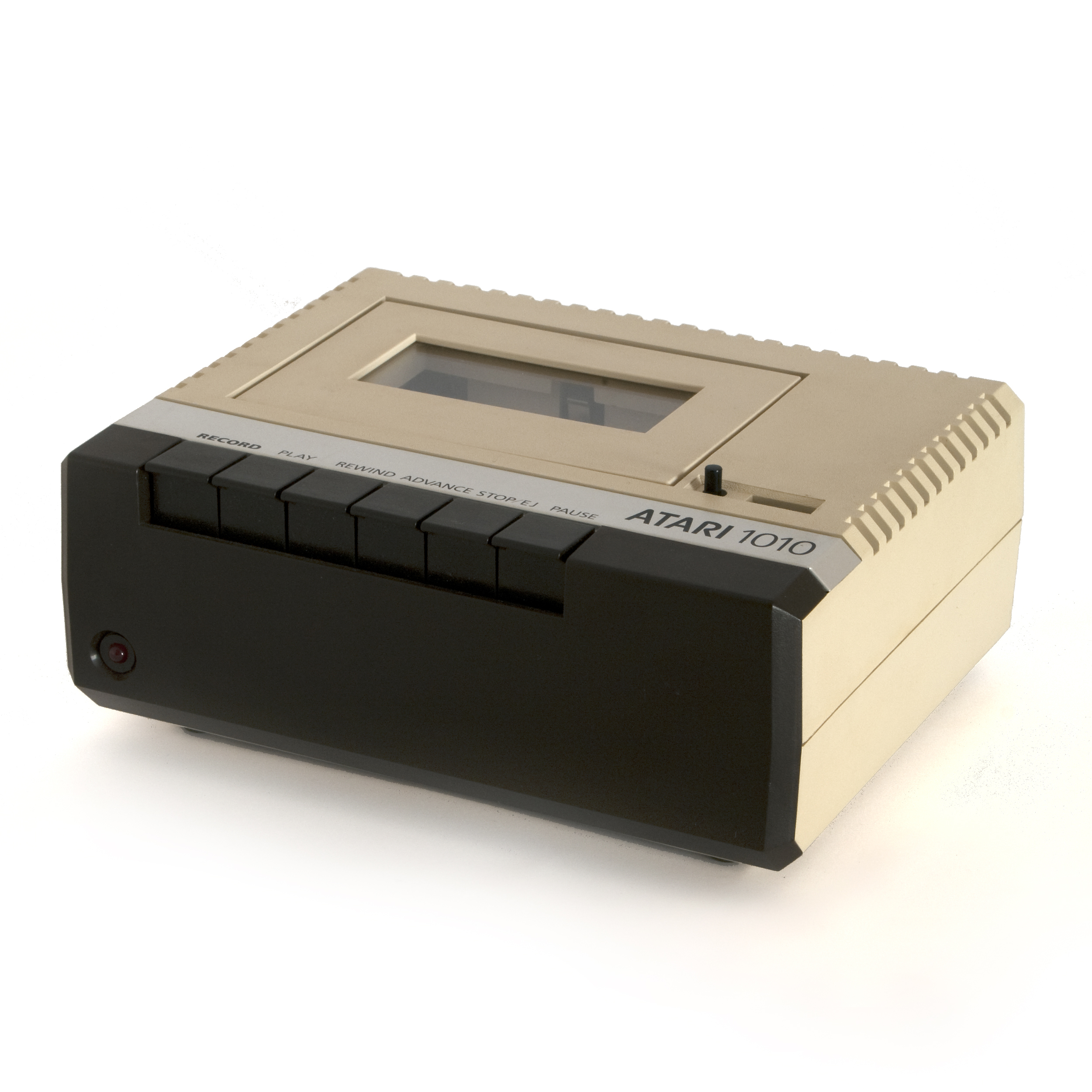
1010 Tape Drive

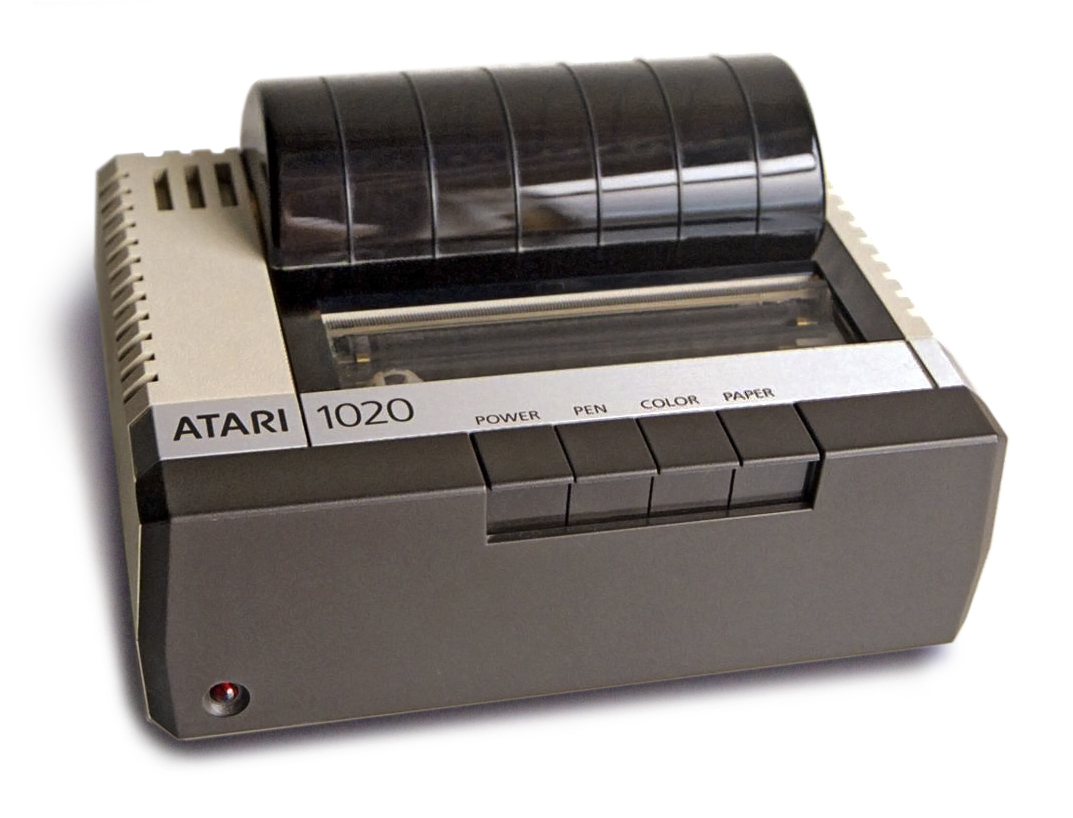
1020 4-color Plotter

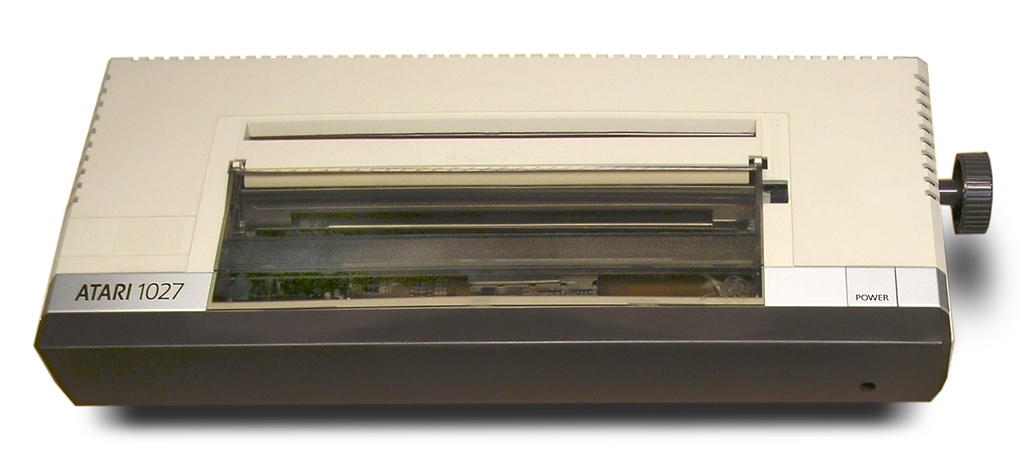
1027 Printer

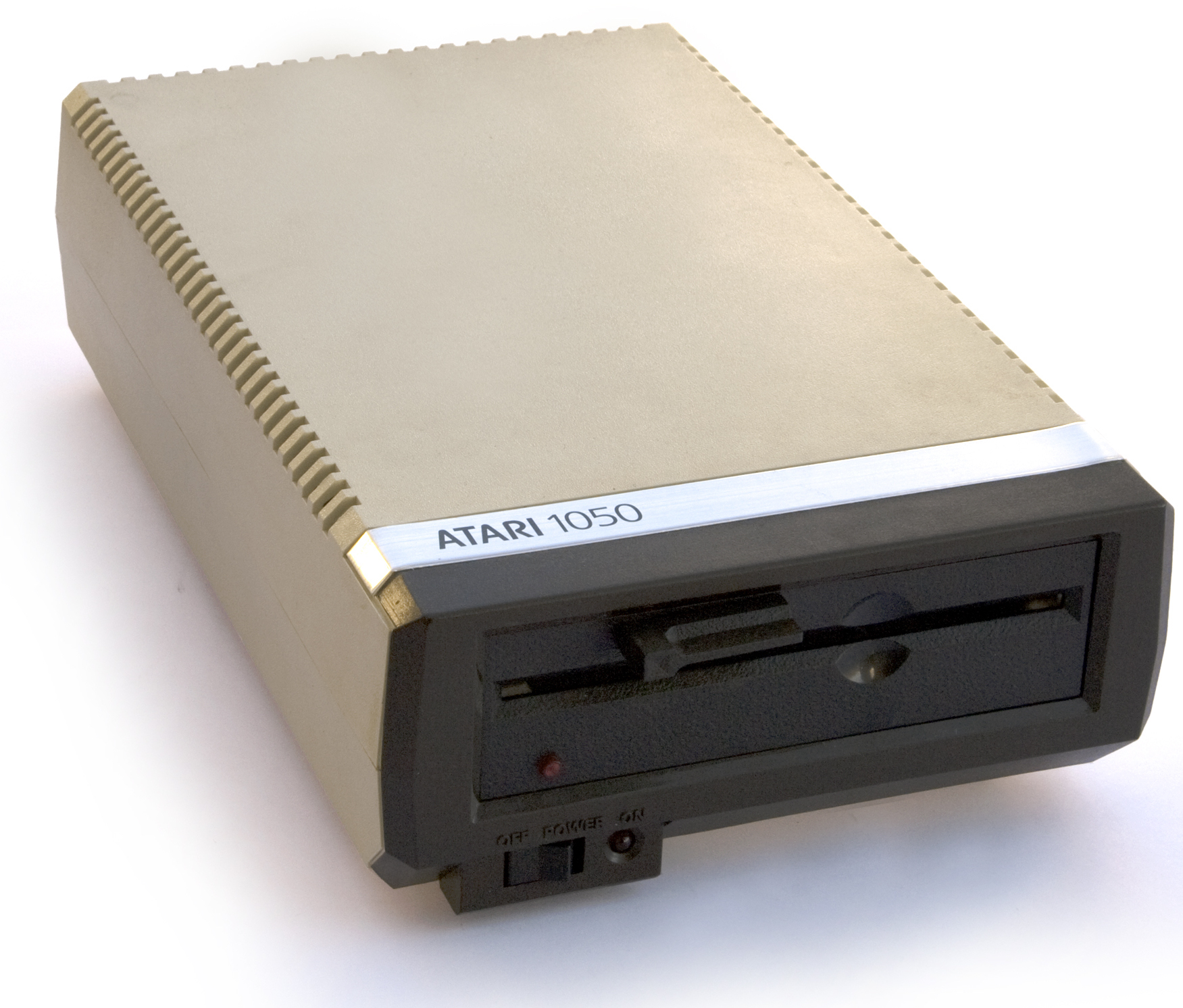
1050 Disk Drive

=== XE era (1985 onward) ===
- XEP80 Interface Module - provides 80-column display and a Centronics parallel interface for a printer, controlled by NS405, an 8048 based chip. Attached via a joystick port controlled at 15625 baud horizontal video timing.
- XC11 Program Recorder - a tape drive
- XC12 Program Recorder - a tape drive (small model like the 1010, sold worldwide). It was based on an earlier tape drive, Phonemark PM-4401A, not manufactured by Atari. A number of similar models were released, not marketed by Atari, mainly in Eastern Europe and Latin America, including these:
  - XCA12 (same case as XC12)
  - CA12 (same case as XC12)
  - XL12 tape drive (an XC12 with minor changes)
- XF551 Disk Drive - 5¼" floppy disk, double-density double-sided, 360 KB
- XMM801 Dot-Matrix Graphics Printer - 80-column
- XDM121 Letter-Quality Daisy-Wheel Printer - 80-column
- XM301 Modem - 300 baud
- SX212 Modem - 1200 baud (also included RS-232 for use on Atari ST and other computers)
- XG-1 - a light gun, bundled with the Atari XEGS

==== Prototypes and vaporware ====
- XF351 - 3½" floppy drive (never released)
- XF521 - 5¼" floppy drive, 1050 compatible, XE style (never released)
- XC1411 - 14" composite monitor (never released)
- XM128 - 12" monochrome monitor (never made)
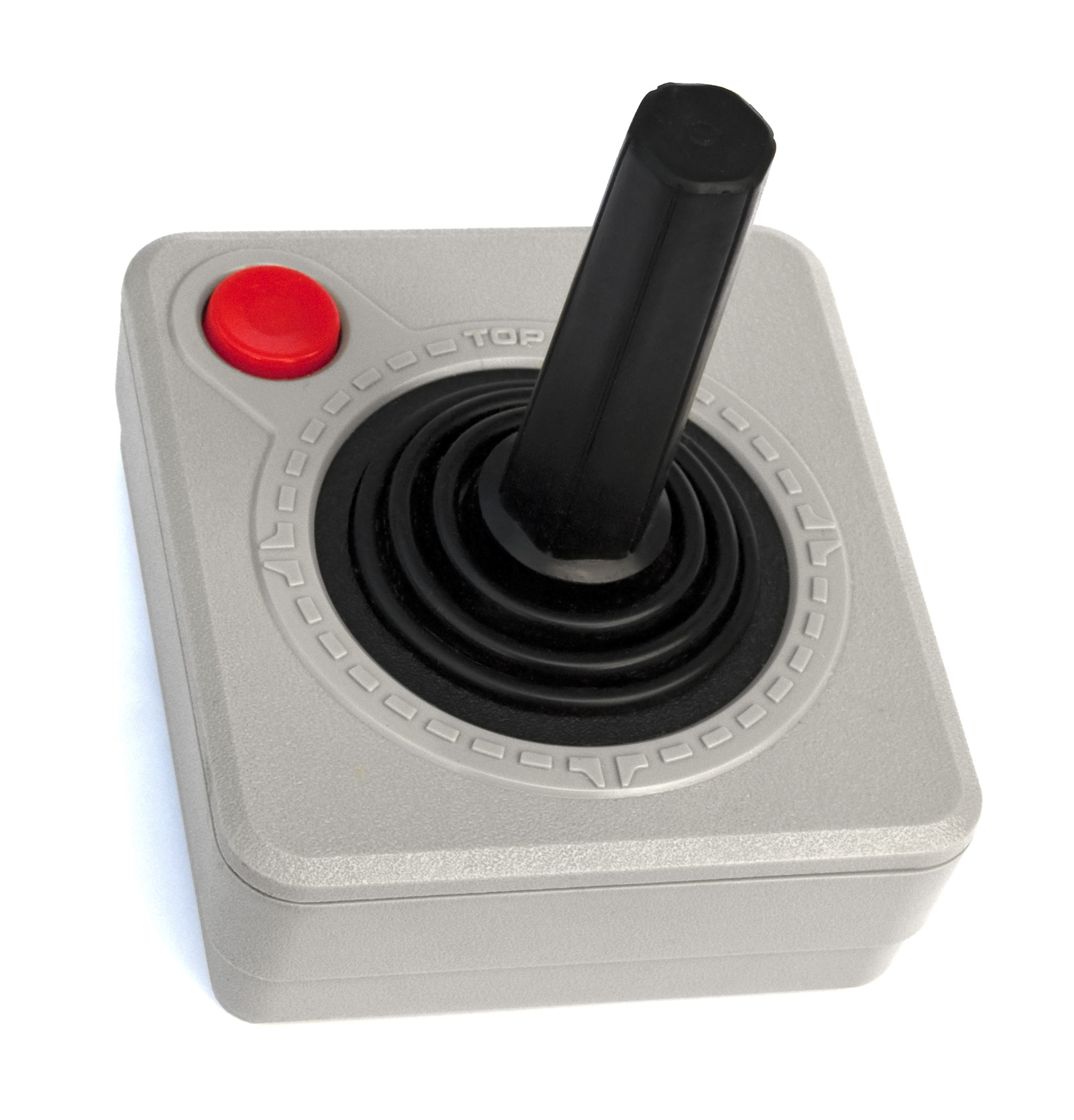
CX40 joystick (XE grey version)

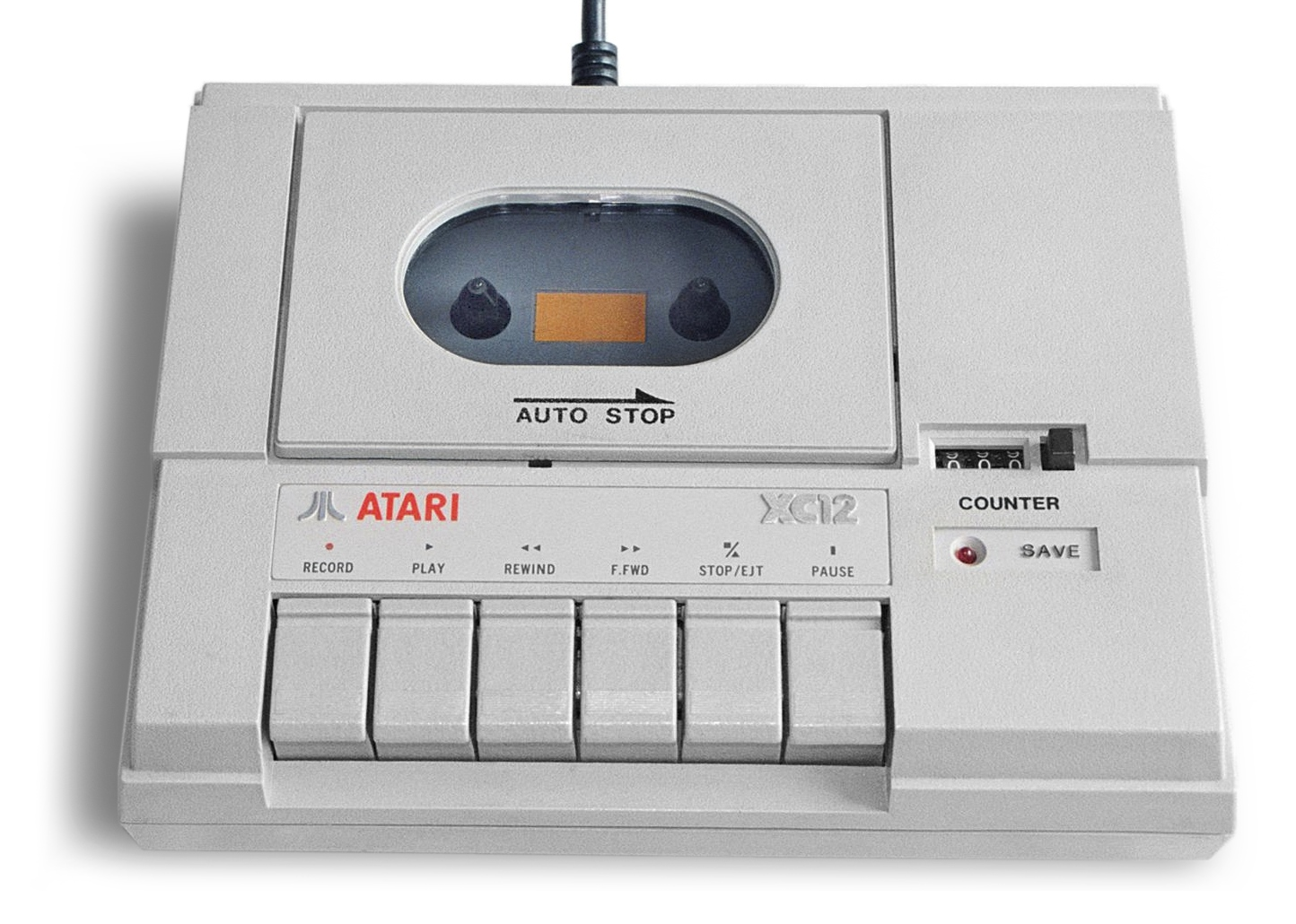
Atari XC12 program recorder

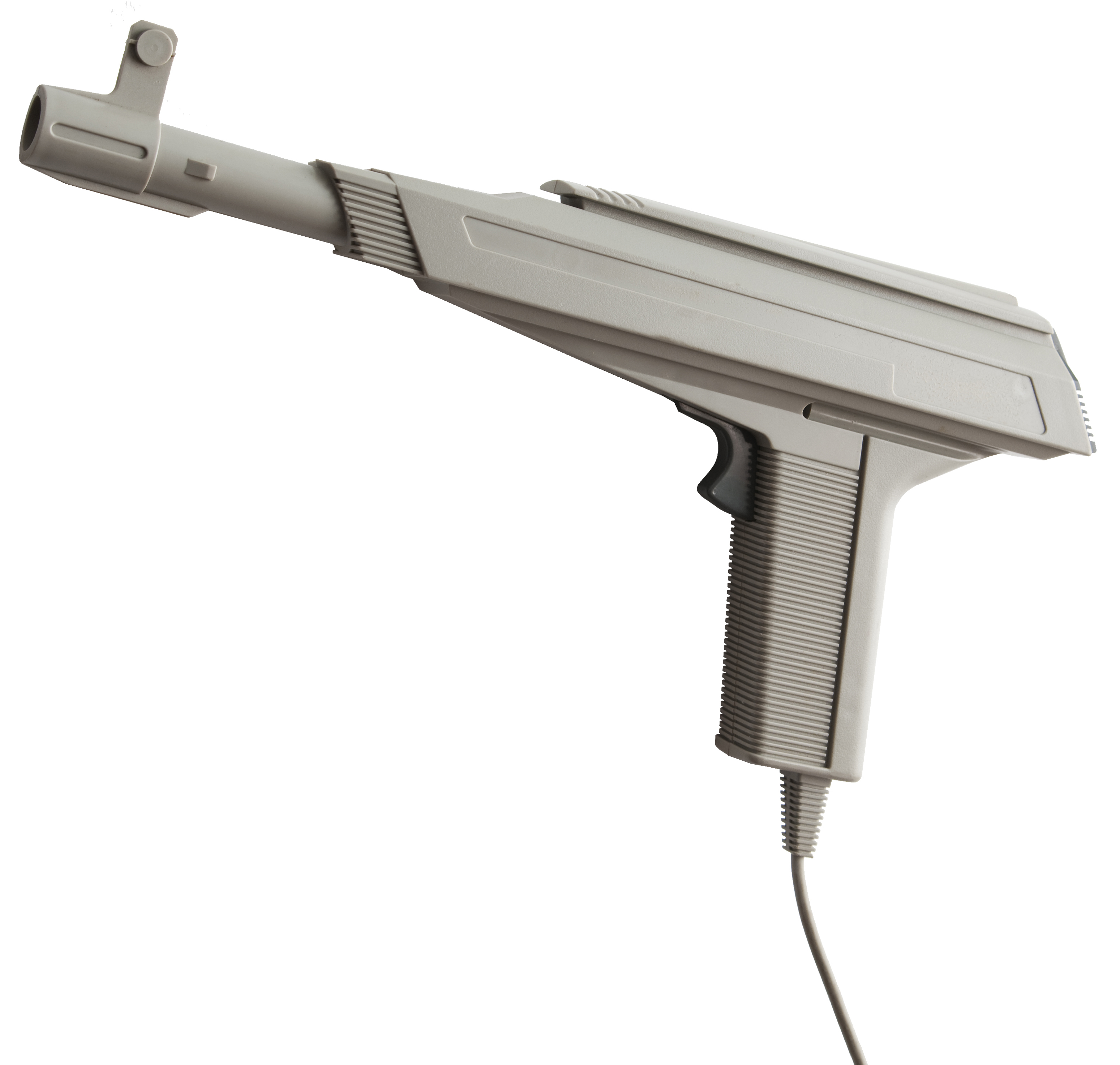
Atari XG-1 light gun
