= MOS Technology 6532 =

Integrated circuit

Pin configuration of the 6532 RIOT

The 6532 RAM-I/O-Timer (RIOT) was an integrated circuit made by MOS Technology, as well as second sources such as Rockwell. It incorporates 128 bytes of static RAM, two bidirectional 8-bit digital input/output ports, and an 8-bit Programmable interval timer (with pre-divider). This high degree of integration made it popular in the late 1970s and early 1980s, as it could take the place of several different integrated circuits (ICs).

The RIOT is perhaps best known for its use in the Atari 2600 video game console. Parallel port A was used to read the directional controls for the two joysticks, while the Atari's Television Interface Adaptor (TIA) handled the fire buttons. Port B was used to read the various console switches like Reset and Difficulty. The internal static RAM was all the machine used, which is why it had only 128 bytes of memory. Additionally, the timer was used to interrupt the 6507 when it was time for the TIA to begin drawing again, saving the CPU from having to calculate that internally.

The chip was also deployed in Gottlieb pinball machines, such as Haunted House and Black Hole, the Atari 810 and 1050 disk drives, as well as Commodore's 8050, 8250 & 8250LP PET disk drives. The Atari 850 Interface, which gives the Atari 400 and 800 computers four RS-232 interfaces and a Centronics parallel printer port, uses two 6532 chips.

6532 ICs were available in 1 MHz and 2 MHz versions. The form factor was a 40-pin ceramic or plastic DIP package.
