= 10/5 =

10/5 may refer to:

- October 5 (month-day date notation)
- May 10 (day-month date notation)
- 10 shillings and 5 pence in UK predecimal currency

== See also ==
- 105 (disambiguation)
- 5/10 (disambiguation)
