= MLV =

MLV may refer to:

- The Roman numeral for 1055
  - a number in the numbers number range
  - the year AD 1055 CE
- M. L. Vasanthakumari (1928−1990; Madras Lalitangi Vasanthakumari), Indian singer
- Major League Volleyball, a women's professional volleyball league in the United States (1987−1989)
- Major League Volleyball (2026), a women's professional volleyball league in the United States that begins play in 2026
- Mass-loaded vinyl, typically used for sound proofing/dampering
- Medium-lift launch vehicle, a category of orbital rockets capable of lifting 2 to 20 tons to low Earth orbit
- Medium Launch Vehicle, a rocket developed by Firefly Aerospace and Northrop Gumman, now known as Eclipse
- Meningeal lymphatic vessels, lymphatic vessels located in the Meninges
- Modern Literal Version, a modern literal translation of the Christian Bible
- Motor Luggage Van, British Rail Class 419
- Multilamellar vesicle (biology and chemistry), a bubble of liquid with more than one phospholipid bilayer
- MultiLevel, Bombardier MultiLevel Coach
- Multi-layer varistor, a device providing electrostatic discharge protection to electronic circuits
- Multiple-language version, a film production strategy of making a single film in two or more different languages
- Murine leukemia virus, a retrovirus which causes cancer in mice
- Mwotlap language (ISO 639 langue code: mlv)
- Malvinas VOR-DME (beacon: MLV), at the Las Malvinas Airport
- Merluna Airport (IATA airport code: MLV); see List of airports in Australia
- Dutch Military Proficiency Badge (MLV; Dutch: Militaire Lichamelijke Vaardigheid)

== See also ==
- 1055 (disambiguation)
- M55 (disambiguation)
- MIV (disambiguation)
