= Atari 810 =

Disk drive for the Atari 8-bit computers

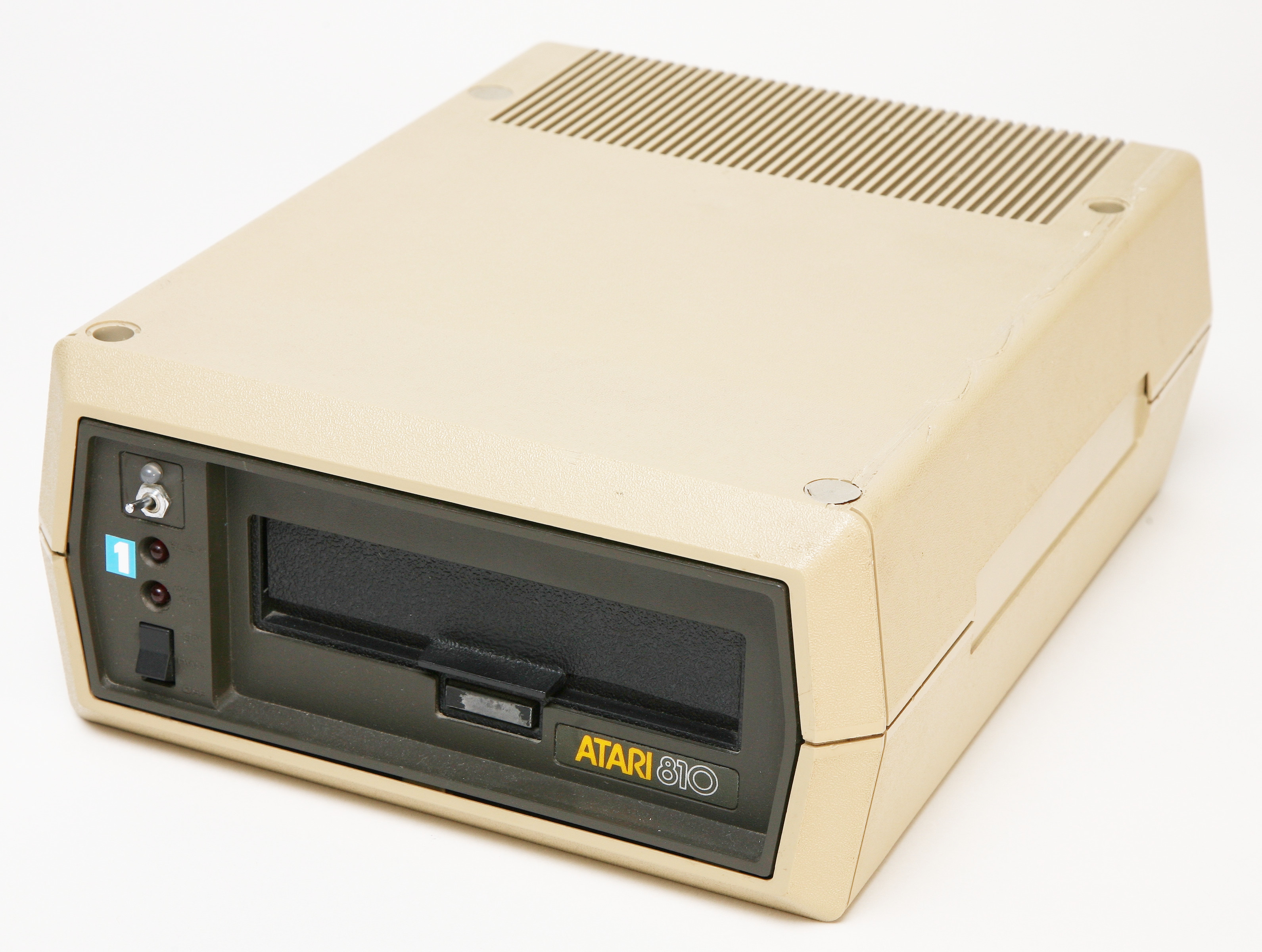
An Atari 810 floppy disk drive with a worn door-open button. The toggle switch in the upper left is a user modification.

The Atari 810 is the official floppy disk drive for the Atari 400 and 800, the first two models of Atari 8-bit computers. It was released by Atari, Inc. in 1980.

The single-density drive provides 90 kB of storage. The 810 has a data transfer rate of 6 kbps in most cases and a number of reliability issues. Third-party enhancements such as the Happy 810 address these problems, as do replacement drives like the Indus GT with more storage and other features.

At the same time as the 810, Atari announced the double-density Atari 815, allowing 180 kB per disk, with two drives in one case. It was never put into full production and only small numbers reached the market.

The 810 was replaced by the Atari 1050 with the release of the XL series machines in 1983. The 1050 was replaced in turn in 1987 by the XF551 with a double-sided, double-density 360 kB mode.

== History ==
=== Atari vs. Apple ===
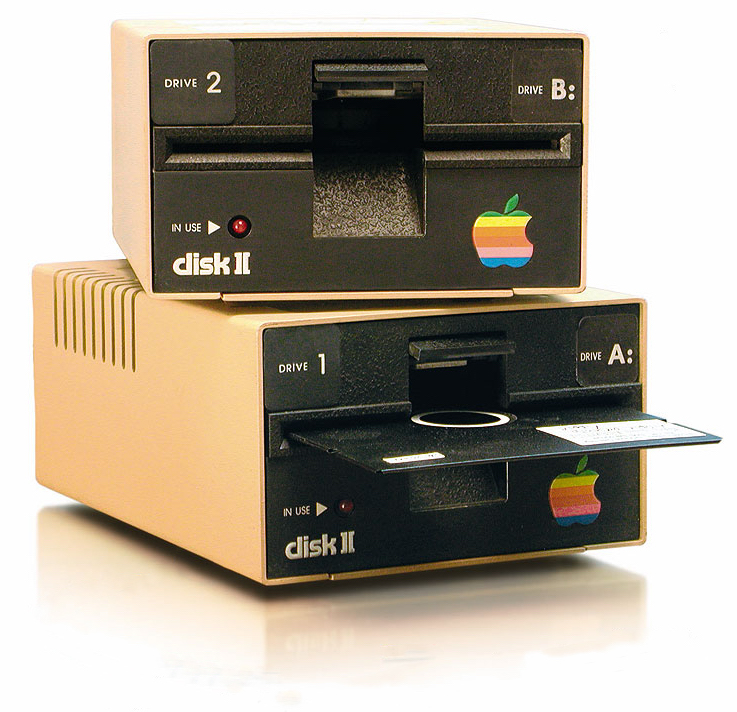
A pair of Disk II drives, which can both be driven from a single expansion card in the Apple II.

The machines that emerged as the Atari 8-bit computers had originally been designed as part of a project to develop a driver chipset for a new games console. During the time the chips were being developed, the Apple II became very popular and propelled Apple Computer into one of the largest initial public offerings of its era. Atari, recently purchased by Warner Communications, had placed Ray Kassar in the CEO position in March 1978. He decided to redirect the chipset to the emerging home computer market to take on Apple.

One of the key reasons for the Apple II's success was the Disk II, introduced in June 1978 at the very low (for the era) price of $495 (equivalent to $2,443 in 2025) plus the interface card. The interface was based on a system Steve Wozniak had previously built while working at Hewlett-Packard to control a Shugart Associates SA-400 floppy drive. Steve Jobs went to Shugart and asked for a stripped-down drive mechanism for $100; Shugart responded by shipping them 25 prototypes of a new model they called the SA-390. Woz's controller then provided the bits that Shugart had removed, allowing two drives to be controlled by a single card. The resulting system operated at 15 kbps, making it faster than any of the competing designs of the era.

=== New design ===
The new Atari machines faced the problem that the Federal Communications Commission (FCC) had recently introduced standards to deal with the profusion of systems that connected to televisions that were causing significant problems with interference. The new rules were extremely strict, requiring a lengthy and costly testing suite to be run against any new product and anything that connected to it. Apple avoided this by not connecting to a television; instead, a 3rd party sold the required RF modulator and thus Apple didn't need testing. Atari was determined to make a plug-and-play system that connected directly to the television, like the Atari VCS. This precluded the idea of having expansion slots that could be connected to external equipment, like on the Apple, as the openings would be difficult to shield property to avoid RF leakage.

This led to the introduction of the SIO serial bus, a system that allowed devices to be daisy chained to a single port. Using a cable made shielding to the required levels much easier, but also required the external devices to host the interface circuitry that would normally be placed on an expansion card inside the machine. This drove up the complexity and cost of the external devices. To offset this as much as possible, Atari used discarded MOS 6507 chips from the VCS production line as the basis for the interface. Atari purchased large numbers of 6507s from Synertek that were officially rated for operation at 1 MHz, but most of them were being able to run at a slightly higher 1.1 MHz that the VCS worked at. Those that did not, a small proportion of the chips, were simply warehoused at Atari. As they had already been paid for, and were essentially free, they were perfect for use as low-cost microcontrollers like the one in the 810.

Atari's drives entered the market almost two years later than Apple, giving them time to take advantage of the rapid improvements taking place in the industry. Most notable was the entry of several other manufacturers to the drive market, including Alps Electric and Micro Peripherals Inc (MPI). Atari arranged a deal with MPI for their mechanisms and designed their own controller to drive it, combining the 6507 running at 500 kHz with a standard FM encoding drive controller, the Western Digital FD1771.

Despite these efforts to lower cost, the resulting drive was still more expensive than the Disk II, listed at $599 when it was introduced in 1979. It also had the disadvantage of running slower than the Disk II; although the underlying SIO bus was running at 19.2 kbps, the effective data rate was generally around 6 kbps, compared to about 15 kbps for the Disk II. This is one reason the machine was never considered seriously in the business market; applications like VisiCalc were not competitive with the Apple II when run on the Atari or Commodore 64.

In a 1982 review for a third party replacement, InfoWorld described the 810 as "noisy, slow and inefficient by today's standards, and it had some reliability problems" and then described the sounds as "At times it almost seemed sick, the groans and creaks were so intense." Brian Moriarty, writing in the ANALOG Computing magazine, described it as having "notoriously poor speed regulation" in maintaining its non-standard 288 RPM, (Note: The standard for floppy drives of the era was 300 RPM.) while Garry Francis noted in Page 6 magazine that the speed would tend to drift over time, causing disks written at different speeds to become unreadable without adjustment. (Note: Testing the limits of the speeds that allowed reading was part of Dan Kramer's engineering logbooks.) This led to a number of small programs, like Snail and Drive RPM, that would test the speed of the drive in software in order to aid the user in adjusting it back to 288.

Initial units shipped with Atari DOS 1.0, sometimes known as DOS I. This was replaced by DOS 2.0S in 1981.

=== 815 ===
While the 8-bit machines were first being introduced, the first MFM double-density drive controllers were appearing, allowing the same disks to store twice as much data, 180 kB. Early advertising for the new machines often showed the 815, which combined two drives in a single case and used MFM encoding. The price was listed at $1,495.

For reasons unknown, the 815 was never produced in quantity. Small numbers were hand-built using Tandon drives during 1980 and a few shipped to customers starting in June, but full-scale production never began. It continued to appear on company price lists for the next year, with the last known reference being Atari's internal price list of 24 August 1981.

To support the larger storage capacity, the drives used a modified version of DOS 2.0, 2.0D. The controller was custom and only supported MFM, making the 815 incompatible with disks used in the 810.

=== Third party upgrades ===
Third parties exploring the capabilities of the 810 system soon demonstrated that the 19.2 kbps speed of the SIO communications could be easily doubled. It was later revealed that the speed was not a limitation of the SIO port, but the maximum speed of the logic analyzer available in the lab where it was being developed. Best known among the many products was the Happy 810, introduced in 1982. It added a buffer able to cache one entire track of data, and along with the associated Warp Speed software, increased read performance about three times, making it very competitive with the Apple II.

The performance and reliability problems with the 810 also led to a thriving market for third-party drives like the Rana 1000 and Indus GT, along with a wide selection of replacements for Atari DOS. Combining one of these drives with a replacement DOS offered higher performance and often true double-density support. As the double-density format had been set with the 815 in 1980, these drives used that format as the basis for their disks as well.

=== Replacement ===
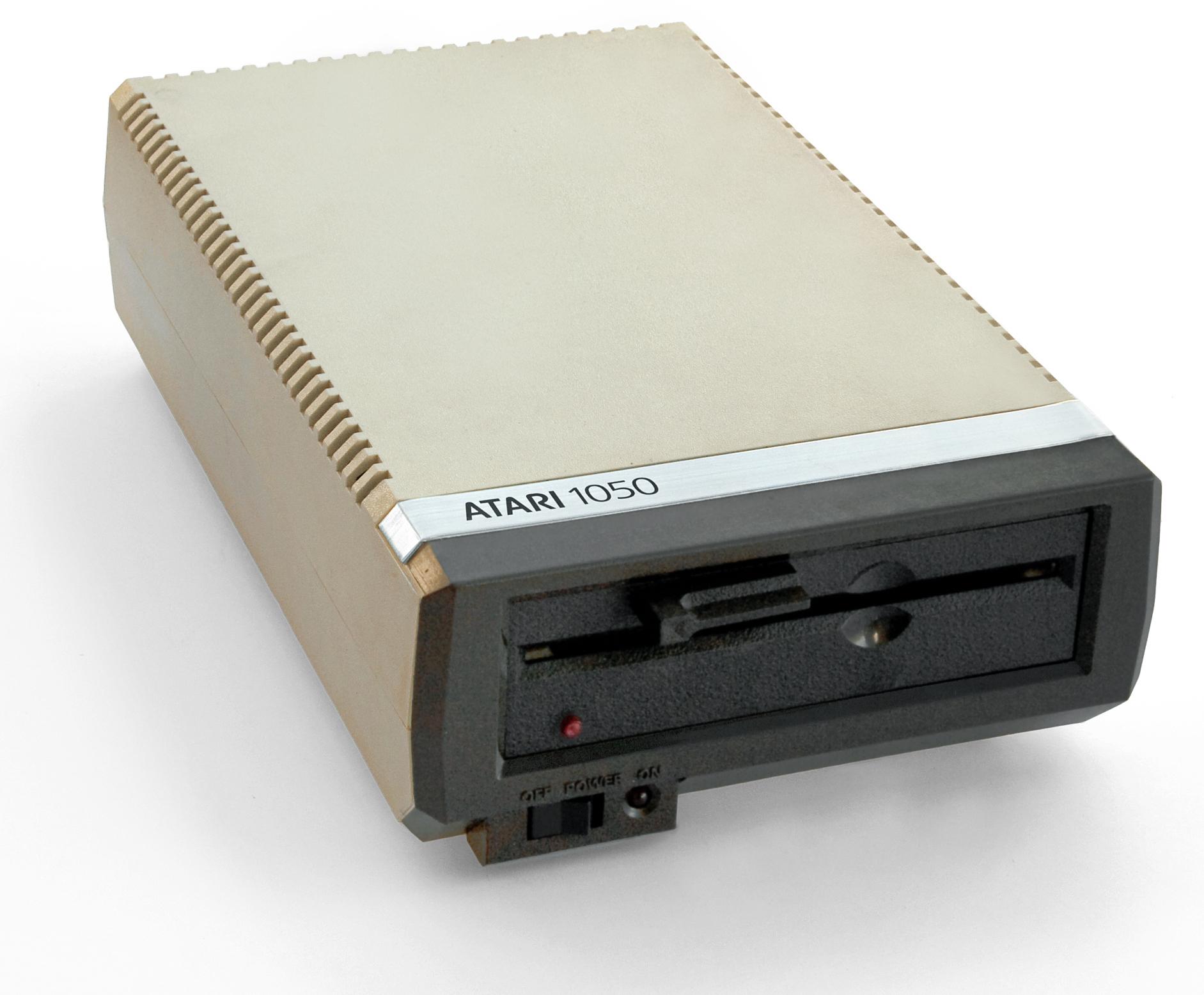
The 1050 replaced the 810 in 1983, with a more compact design and larger storage capacity.

In April 1982, Atari began the process of designing improved versions of the 8-bit series, then referred to as the Sweet 8 and Sweet 16. Changes to the plans led to only one of these designs being released as the 1200XL. Containing "no true innovations", the most notable change was the introduction of a new design language from Regan Cheng using off-white and black plastics with brushed metal overlay on switches and other fixtures. This led to the introduction of a new line of peripherals that matched the styling. Initially this included the Atari 1010 cassette deck, the Atari 1020 plotter, and 1025 printers.

When the 1200XL was introduced at the Winter Consumer Electronics Show in December 1982, there was no sign of a new floppy drive. One reviewer noted that when he went looking all he could find was the "old model 810 clunkers", and speculated that "we will be seeing a new drive from Atari within the next half year". This prediction came true; when the 1200XL finally reached the market in June 1983, it was accompanied by the new Atari 1050. It offered the new "enhanced" or "dual density" option that improved formatted capacity to 130 kB, although it was some time before DOS was upgraded to support it. The 1050 quickly replaced the 810 in the market.

== Description ==
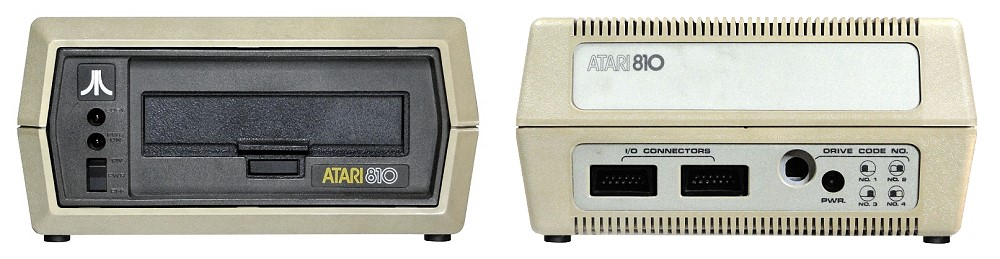
The front featured the power switch and power and access LEDs. The rear has (left to right) two SIO ports, a switch for selecting the drive number, and the power jack.

The 810 case was designed by Roy Nishi and Russ Farnell. It used identical C-shaped sections for the top and bottom of the drive, with four small circular indentations embossed into the case where rubber feet were adhered on the bottom during assembly. This meant the feet on one drive were naturally positioned over the empty circles on the top of the drive below it, providing sturdy stacking. The front of the case had the power switch, similar to the one used on the computer and most other peripherals in the line. The unit drew about 20W, so it was normally turned off when not in use. Two LED lamps were placed on the front, one indicated that power was on and the other blinked when the drive was being accessed. The back of the case had two SIO ports to allow daisy-chaining, a ring jack for the external power supply, and two pin switches to select the drive number from 1 to 4.

The drive saw a series of improvements over time. The original 810 had problems with speed regulation and also had marginal ability to distinguish between clock pulses and data on some disks. Starting on 1 September 1981, all new 810s were built to the "DS" standard, for "Data Separator", identifiable by a small sticker. These versions added an External Data Separator Board which plugged into the socket for the FD1771 chip, providing more separation between the signals and improving read reliability. It also attempted to address the motor control speed issues, which required the Side Board to be replaced and the voltage of the circuit to be increased to 12V. As the original 9V power supply was retained, the conversion required more power to provide a second 12V output, increasing average use from about 20W to 30W. The upgrade was offered to owners of earlier models.

In November 1981 a further upgrade was offered with the C-version ROM. This modified the sector layout during formatting to improve reading performance, as much as 20% on average. Like the DS, the C-version ROM was also offered to existing owners. From February 1982 the line switched to the "810M Analog" version. This added an entirely new card, the Power Supply Board, which included a tachometer that finally solved the speed problems. It also replaced a number of components in an effort to improve reliability.

The original MPI mechanisms used a unique drive door mechanism. The door slid vertically and was sprung to hold it normally open, in the upper position, revealing the drive slot behind it. A handle-like extension on the front of the door allowed the user to pull it down to close it, which latched when reaching the bottom of its travel. A button unlocked the door, causing it to flip open. In November 1982, the drive mechanism switched from MPI to a new mechanism from Tandon, which was known as the "810T Analog". The main external difference was that the former push-and-lift door was replaced by a simpler turn-to-open latch. The drive was otherwise the same as the 810M.

The disks were formatted with 40 tracks, or 48 tracks per inch, with 18 sectors per track, for a total of 720 sectors per disk. Each sector held 128 bytes, for a total storage of 92,160 bytes/disk (90 kB). Later models with the C ROM, and a number of third party upgrades, used a staggered sector layout to reduce seek time and improve read performance as much as 30% over the original layout. The drive ignored the alignment hole, and thus did not need the two-hole "flippy disk" to use the second side. It did respect the write-protect notch, so using the back side of a disk required another notch to be punched or one of the many updates that allowed the notch to be ignored.
