= Model 55 =

Model 55 may refer to:

== Aircraft ==
- Beech Model 55, a twin-piston-engine civil utility aircraft
- Curtiss Model 55 Kingbird, an airliner first flown in 1929
- Learjet Model 55, a business jet

== Firearms ==
- Model 55 Reising, a submachine gun produced by Harrington & Richardson
- Marlin Model 55, a series of large bolt-action shotguns
- SIG Model 55, the original designation for the SIG MG 710-3, a Swiss general-purpose machine gun
- Winchester Model 55, a lever-action repeating rifle produced from 1924 through 1932 that was a derivative of the Winchester Model 1894

== Other ==
- Frankfort and Cincinnati Model 55 Rail Car, a railcar produced in 1927
- IBM PS/2 Model 55 SX, a midrange member of the PS/2 family of personal computers
- IBM PS/2 Model 55 LS, a diskless workstation
- South Australian Railways Brill Model 55, a railcar introduced in 1924

== See also ==
- M55 (disambiguation)
- Type 55 (disambiguation)
