= M55 =

M55 or M-55 may refer to:

== Military ==
- M55 (rocket), a nerve agent-filled American Cold War-era rocket
- Myasishchev M-55, a Soviet reconnaissance aircraft
- M55 self propelled howitzer, an American self-propelled artillery piece
- M55 machine gun trailer mount, an American quadruple .50 caliber machine gun system based on the M45 Quadmount
- Zastava M55, a Yugoslav/Serbian anti-aircraft gun
- Tikka M55, a Finnish rifle
- M55, a folding stock version of the M50 Reising submachine gun
- M-55S, a Slovenian tank, a modernization of the T-55
- M55 helmet, a Finnish variant of the Stahlhelm

== Science and technology ==
- Messier 55 (M55), a globular cluster in the constellation Sagittarius
- M55, a Samsung Sens laptop computer model
- Samsung Galaxy M55 5G, a mid-range Android-based smartphone
- Siemens M55, a mobile phone
- Cortex-M55, an ARM Cortex-M processor core
- ThinkCentre M55, a ThinkCentre M series PC

== Transportation ==
- M55 (New York City bus), a New York City Bus route in Manhattan

=== Roads ===
- M55 motorway, a road in Lancashire, United Kingdom, connecting Blackpool and the M6 at Preston
- M55 highway (Russia), a 1113 km road connecting Irkutsk and Chita
- M-55 (Michigan highway), a road in Michigan connecting Lake Huron and Lake Michigan
- M55 (Cape Town), a Metropolitan Route in Cape Town, South Africa

== Other uses ==
- M 55, an age group for Masters athletics

== See also ==
- MLV (disambiguation)
- Model 55 (disambiguation)
