= 5/10 =

5/10 may refer to:

- May 10 (month-day date notation)
- October 5 (day-month date notation)
- 5th Battalion, 10th Marines, former US artillery battalion
- 5 shillings and 10 pence in UK predecimal currency

== See also ==
- 10/5 (disambiguation)
- 510, a year
- 5/10 a fraction
