= Happy drives =

Happy drives are series of disk drive enhancements for the Atari 8-bit and Atari ST computer families produced by a small company called Happy Computers. Happy Computers is most noted for the add-in boards for the Atari 810 and Atari 1050 floppy disk drives, which achieved a tremendous speed improvement for reading and writing, and for the ability to backup floppies. Happy's products were among the most popular Atari computer add-ons. They were still in use and active in the aftermarket as of 2009.

== Happy Computers ==
Happy Computers
- Formerly: Happy Computing
- Industry: Disk drive enhancements
- Founded: 1982; 44 years ago
- Founder: Richard Adams

Happy Computers was formed in 1982 by Richard Adams under the name Happy Computing. At that time, the 810 Happy was hand-wired on the internal side board. The name was changed to Happy Computers in 1983 when the company went from a sole proprietorship to a corporation. It stopped shipping these products in 1990, and since then many other Atari enthusiasts have reverse engineered and replicated the products.

As early as 1983 Happy Computing was mentioned in context of software piracy. By 1986 software companies began producing fewer titles for the Atari 8-bit computers than for the Apple II or Commodore 64. They attributed this to their belief that an unusually high amount of software piracy existed on the Atari, and cited Happy Drive as a major cause of the piracy.

== Atari 8-bit products ==
=== 810 Upgrade ===
This was the first product released in 1982. The customer sent in either their 810 drive or the internal sideboard, and the upgrade was wired in. This consisted of a few extra logic chips, a different EPROM and point to point wiring. In addition to the buffered reading and writing with zero latency and faster serial I/O, it made backups of floppies.

=== 810 Enhancement ===
This version of the 810 Happy board was a plug-in board with a better data separator and used sockets already in place on the 810 internal board without the need for any soldering or permanent modification. In addition to the buffered reading and writing with zero latency and faster serial I/O, it made backups of floppies.

Brian Moriarty of ANALOG Computing wrote in 1983 that the magazine was reluctant to publish reviews or advertisements of the 810 Enhancement "because of its unique potential for misuse", but after testing the board "decided that the legitimate performance benefits it offers are too significant to ignore". He found that booting time decreased to 11 seconds from 14–18, formatting time decreased to 25 seconds from 38, and drives would last longer because of more efficient disk access. Moriarty's tests confirmed the company's claim that the board and accompanying Happy Backup software could duplicate any disk readable by the Atari 810 drive. He wrote that the 810 Enhancement's $250 cost would probably be more useful as part of the purchase price of a second disk drive, but those with two drives "would find the high speed and special capabilities of a Happy drive to be a worthwhile investment" and "a pleasure to use". Moriarty concluded, "I hope the ATARI community will not abuse this power by using the Happy drive (and other similar products) to infringe on the rights of others".

=== 1050 Enhancement ===
Atari released the more reliable, enhanced density (130 KB) 1050 drive with the introduction of the Atari 1200XL. The 1050 Enhancement was a plug-in board and could be installed without soldering or permanent modification. In addition to the buffered reading and writing with zero latency and faster serial I/O, it supported true double density (180 KB). The serial I/O of the 1050 Happy was faster than the 810 Happy due to the faster speed of the 6502 processor that replaced the on-board 6507.

=== 1050 Controller ===
The 1050 Controller was a small board that was installed inside the 1050 Happy drive that had 2 switches and an LED that allowed enabling or disabling disk write-protect to override the notch in the disk. It also allowed switch selection of a slower mode to provide compatibility with some picky programs. Some commercial software only ran in the original slow speed mode. The controller required a mechanical modification to the drive's enclosure and hence its installation was more permanent.

=== Warp Speed software ===
The software that came with the Happy boards had many options.

- Warp Speed DOS
- Diagnostics for the Enhancement and the drive such as high speed xfer, RPM and read/write testing
- Fast, slow and unHappy mode drive options for compatibility
- Tracer mode for evaluating wasted space on floppies
- Happy Compactor which allows organizing and combining multiple floppies into one.
- Happy Backup for backing up floppies
- Multi Drive, which allows high speed simultaneous writing with up to 4 Happy enhanced drives.
- Sector copier

=== IBMXFR program ===
This program was included with the Warp Speed software. It allowed transferring files back and forth between an Atari and an IBM disk using a Happy enhanced 1050 drive. Because the 1050 was a single sided drive with only one head, the disk had to be formatted as SS (180 KB). The IBM disk could even be formatted on the 1050 drive.

== Atari 16-bit products ==
=== Discovery Cartridge ===
The Discovery Cartridge was a device that plugged into the cartridge slot of the Atari ST computer. It backed up floppies and had connectors to allow a 3rd and 4th drive to be hooked up. The original ST computer only allowed for two floppy drives, and the extra drives were handy. There were 4 different options available. Options included a pass through for another cartridge, a switch to bank select larger cartridges, and a switch to select/deselect the extra drives. There was also a battery backed up Time of Day clock option in the Discovery Cartridge, a significant oversight the Atari ST lacked in the stock configuration.

The power of the "HART" chip (Happy Atari Rotating Thing), designed by Richard Adams, allowed standard Atari drives to read the unusual Macintosh variable speed disks without needing a variable speed drive. The disks were then re-written in a standard "constant speed" 3.5 inch compatible format called Magic format. This allowed using the various Mac emulator products that would run most efficiently with Magic format disks. At least one of the Macintosh emulators also had a circuit to read Mac disks, but could make the emulations slower and less reliable. It was faster and more efficient to convert Mac disks to Magic format first.

The HART chip (IC number HARTD1©87HCI) also allowed copying conventional ST disks much faster. The computer floppy controller required two passes per track, three with verification. The HART chip could format and write in the same pass, saving one pass per track.

=== Q-Verter Cartridge ===
This was a smaller version of The Discovery Cartridge that plugged into the Atari ST cartridge slot and had a cable for 1 drive that allowed converting Mac disks.
