= 1055 Tynka =

Main-belt asteroid

Discovery
- Discovered by: E. Buchar
- Discovery site: Algiers Obs.
- Discovery date: 17 November 1925

Designations
- Named after: Tynka Buchar (discoverer's mother)
- Alternative designations: 1925 WG · A902 TB
- Minor planet category: main-belt · (inner); Flora

Orbital characteristics
- Epoch 4 September 2017 (JD 2458000.5)
- Uncertainty parameter 0
- Observation arc: 114.42 yr (41,793 days)
- Aphelion: 2.6561 AU
- Perihelion: 1.7402 AU
- Semi-major axis: 2.1981 AU
- Eccentricity: 0.2083
- Orbital period (sidereal): 3.26 yr (1,190 days)
- Mean anomaly: 129.33°
- Mean motion: 0° 18^{m} 8.64^{s} / day
- Inclination: 5.2778°
- Longitude of ascending node: 147.15°
- Argument of perihelion: 176.64°

Physical characteristics
- Dimensions: 8.95±0.22 km 10.31 km (calculated); 13.479±0.225 km
- Synodic rotation period: 5.9818±0.0003 h 11.75±0.01 h 11.893±0.002 h 11.893±0.005 h
- Geometric albedo: 0.169±0.023; 0.24 (assumed); 0.350±0.019
- Spectral type: Tholen = S SMASS = S
- Absolute magnitude (H): 11.90 · 12.00 · 12.1 · 12.33±0.29

1055 Tynka, provisional designation 1925 WG, is a stony Florian asteroid from the inner regions of the asteroid belt, approximately 10 kilometers in diameter. It was discovered on 17 November 1925, by Czech astronomer Emil Buchar at the Algiers Observatory in North Africa, who named it after his mother Tynka Buchar.

== Orbit and classification ==
Tynka is a member of the Flora family (402), a giant asteroid family and the largest family of stony asteroids in the main belt. It orbits the Sun in the inner asteroid belt at a distance of 1.7–2.7 AU once every 3 years and 3 months (1,190 days). Its orbit has an eccentricity of 0.21 and an inclination of 5° with respect to the ecliptic.

The body's observation arc begins with its identification as A902 TB at Heidelberg Observatory in October 1902, more than 23 years prior to its official discovery observation at Algiers.

== Physical characteristics ==
Tynka is a common stony S-type asteroid in both the Tholen and SMASS classification, which agrees with the overall spectral type for members of the Flora family.

=== Rotation period ===
Three rotational lightcurves of Tynka were independently obtained from photometric observations by astronomers David Higgins, Agnieszka Kryszczyńska and Robert Stephens. Lightcurve analysis gave a rotation period of 11.75 and 11.893 hours with a brightness variation between 0.06 and 0.33 magnitude (U=2-/2/2). An alternative period solution of 5.9818 hours with an amplitude of 0.17 was measured by French amateur astronomer René Roy in April 2012 (U=2).

=== Diameter and albedo ===
According to the surveys carried out by the Japanese Akari satellite and the NEOWISE mission of NASA's Wide-field Infrared Survey Explorer, Tynka measures 8.95 and 13.48 kilometers in diameter and its surface has an albedo of 0.169 and 0.350, respectively.

The Collaborative Asteroid Lightcurve Link assumes an albedo of 0.24 – derived from 8 Flora, the largest member and namesake of the Flora family – and calculates a diameter of 10.31 kilometers based on an absolute magnitude of 12.1.

== Naming ==
This minor planet was named by the discoverer after his mother Tynka Buchar. The official naming citation was mentioned in The Names of the Minor Planets by Paul Herget in 1955 (H 100). Emil Buchar (1901–1979) worked at the Institute of Astronomy and Geophysics at the Technical University in Prague and was a pioneer of satellite geodesy. This asteroid was his only minor-planet discovery. The minor planet 3141 Buchar was named in his honor.
