= 105 =

105 may refer to:

- 105 (number), the natural number following 104 and preceding 106
- AD 105, a year in the 2nd century AD
- 105 BC, a year in the 2nd century BC
- 105 (telephone number), the emergency telephone number in Mongolia
- Route 105 (MBTA), a bus route in Massachusetts, US
- 105 (Northumberland) Construction Regiment, Royal Engineers, an English military unit
- 105th Regiment Royal Artillery
- "105", a song by Kim Petras
- "105", a 2003 song by Smash Mouth from the album Get the Picture?
- 105 Artemis, a main-belt asteroid
- Škoda 105, a compact sedan
- Rover 105, a saloon
- Radio 105, an Italian radio station
  - Radio 105 TV, an Italian music television channel

== See also ==
- 10/5 (disambiguation)
- Dubnium, chemical element with atomic number 105
