= Indus GT =

Floppy disk drive

The Indus GT is a 5 1/4-inch floppy disk drive that was introduced by Indus Systems in 1983 for the Atari 8-bit computers. It was later released for the Apple II and Commodore 64. On the Atari, it was widely regarded as the best drive of the era, with the most features, highest performance, and even best industrial design. They were known for the advertising slogan, "Turn your Atari into a Ferrari." The GT was sold until around 1987, at which point the rights were sold to Logical Design Works and reintroduced as the LDW Super 2000, sold primarily into Poland, and the CA-2001, sold into the US.

The GT drive is housed in a black metal case and the opening in the front for the floppy was covered by a flip-open smoked plexiglass door that makes the unit look completely sealed when closed. A two-digit seven-segment LED display is on the face of the unit behind the door, but remains readable even with the door closed. Buttons beside the display allow the user to select among track number, most recent error code, and the type of formatting on the disk, single, enhanced (or dual), or double-density. A fourth button enables write protection, while a real-panel switch lets the user to select the default format.

The drive was based on the Tandon TM50 half-height mechanism connected to a Western Digital 2797 drive controller. The connection to the host computer was controlled by a Zilog Z80. A later upgrade from Indus, the RAMCharger, added 64 kB of random-access memory (RAM) and a PAL chip that allowed the drive to run CP/M software.

For Atari users, the drive shipped with DOS XL from Optimized Systems Software, authors of the original Atari DOS. DOS XL added support for double-density disks although it could still format and read and write single-density disks for use with other Atari drives. It did not, however, support the "enhanced" density mode introduced on the Atari 1050, although the drive itself could be used with such disks if the host machine was booted with Atari DOS 2.5 instead of DOS XL.

Indus later introduced their own speed improvement, "Synchromesh", which doubled the transfer speed over the SIO bus to 38.4 kbit/s. A later version, "SuperSynchromesh", improved this further to 68 kbit/s. One complaint was that the Synchromesh software took a long time to load, so modified boot disks appeared to improve this. It was considered a high-quality unit, regarded by many as the best floppy drive available for 8-bit Ataris.

It was advertised as being over 400% as fast as the Commodore 1541 and has an internal "ROM drive" with DOS utility software, but suffers, as do many third-party Commodore-1541-imitation drives, from being less than 100% 1541-compatible.
