= Atari 1020 =

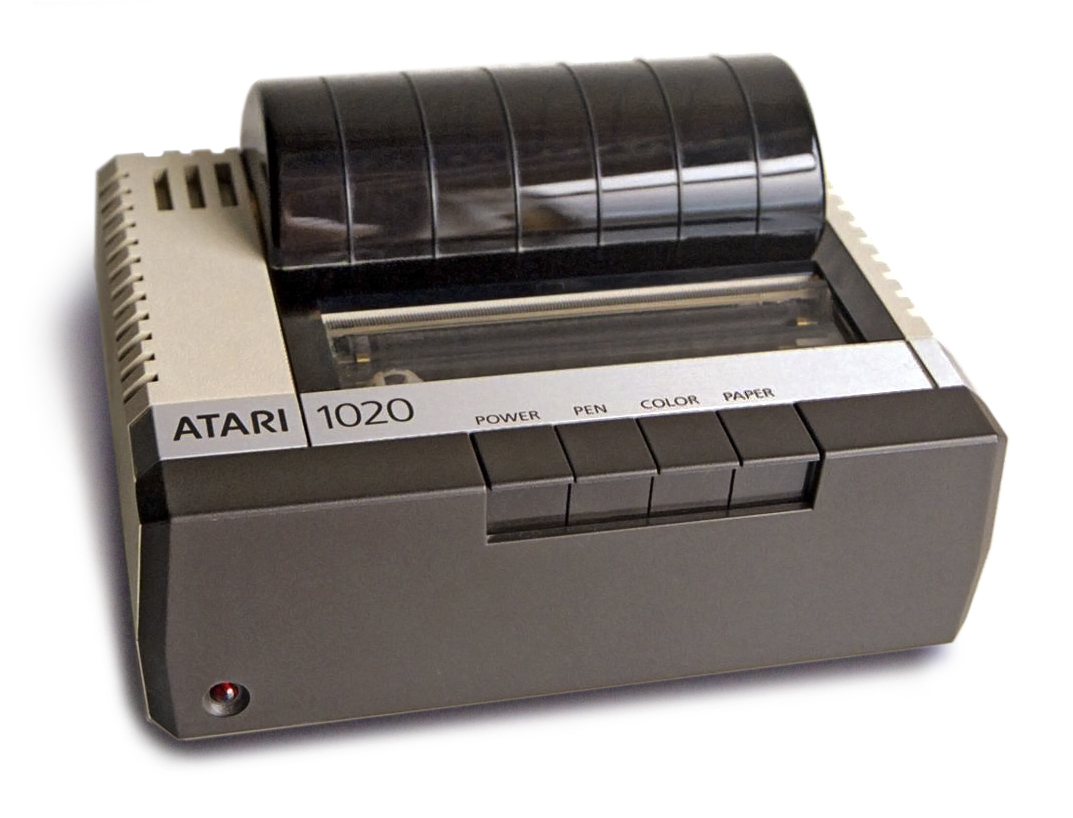
Atari 1020 four-colour plotter

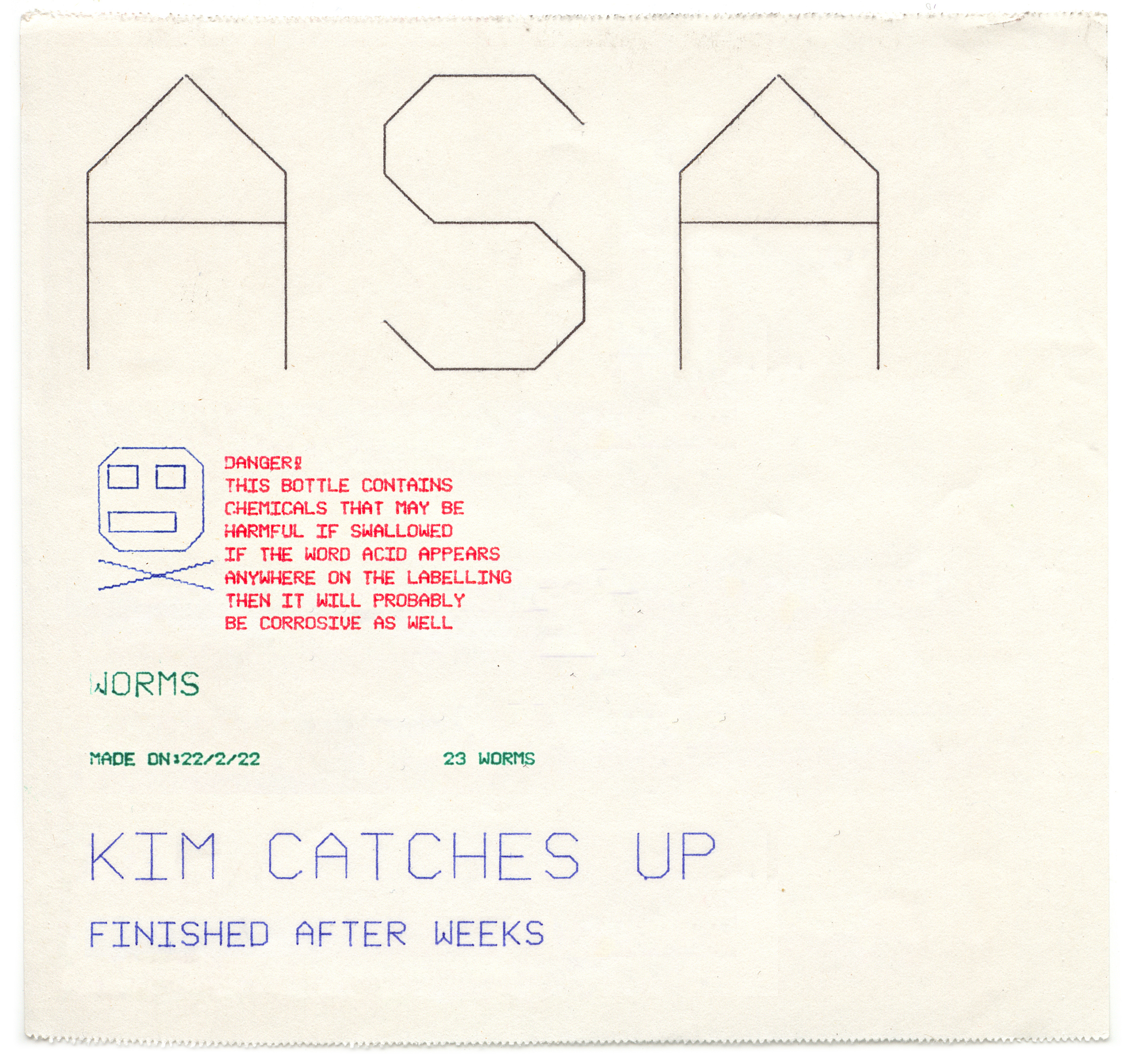
Example printout

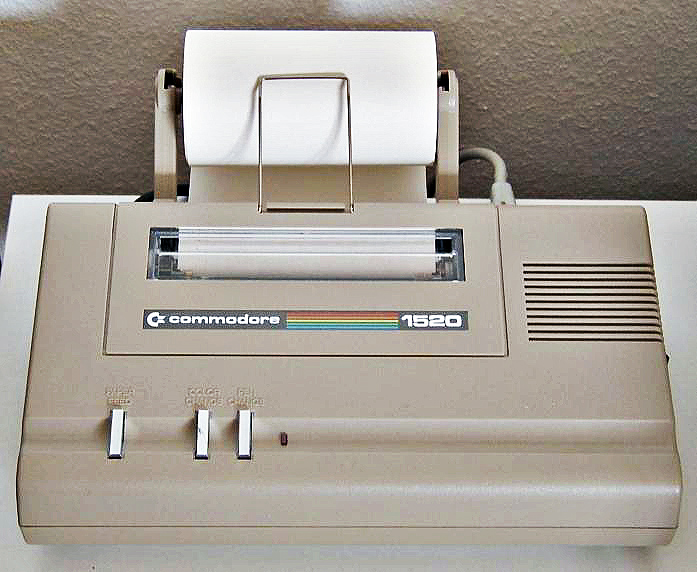
The Commodore 1520 plotter is based on the same mechanism.

The Atari 1020 is a four-color computer plotter which was sold by Atari, Inc. for Atari 8-bit computers. The 1020 is capable of 20-, 40- and 80-column text and graphics using a friction-fed roll of paper approximately 11.5 cm (4.5 inches) in width. Graphics are generated using one of four coloured pens to draw lines, using a combination of the horizontally moving pen barrel and the vertically scrolling paper to create diagonal lines.

The 1020 is based on a plotter mechanism manufactured by ALPS. The same mechanism formed the basis of several other low-cost plotters produced around the same time, including the Commodore 1520, the Oric MCP40, the Tandy/Radio Shack CGP-115, the Texas Instruments HX-1000, and the Mattel Aquarius 4615. However, the 1020 connected via the Atari 8-bit's proprietary SIO interface, eliminating the need for an 850 serial/parallel interface module, but limiting its use to Atari 8-bit computers.

The plotter can be controlled from Atari BASIC.
