= ECI =

ECI may refer to:

== Companies ==
- ECI Partners, a British private equity group
- ECI Telecom, an Israeli telecommunication equipment manufacturer
- Egg Clearinghouse, an American egg clearinghouse
- El Corte Inglés, a Spanish retailer
- Engine Components Inc., an American aircraft engine manufacturer
- Eze Castle Integration, a managed services provider for financial services firms

== Education ==
- Early childhood intervention, a support and educational system for very young children
- Eastwood Collegiate Institute, in Kitchener, Ontario, Canada
- Emergency care instructor, a person who provides training in emergency care
- Etobicoke Collegiate Institute, in Ontario, Canada

== Government bodies ==
- Election Commission of India, a body established by the Constitution of India
- European Citizens' Initiative, in the European Union
- Evangelical Climate Initiative, in the United States

== Indexes ==
- Economic Complexity Index, an economic indicator
- Efficiency of conversion, efficiency of food conversion, an index measure of food fuel efficiency in animals
- Employment cost index, in the United States

== Science and technology ==
- Earth-centered inertial, a coordinate system
- Enhanced Cartridge Interface, a computer interface
- Enterprise content integration, a software technology
- Extended Channel Interpretation, a communication protocol extension for the bar code reader to host interface
- European Color Initiative, an expert group
- E-UTRAN Cell Identity (ECI), an identity for a cell within a network in LTE

== Other uses ==
- Eastern Congo Initiative, an American development charity
- Engineering Council of India
- Evangelical Church of India
- World Federation of Energy, Chemical and Various Industry Workers' Unions, a former international trade union secretariat
