= Duncan L. Niederauer =

American businessman

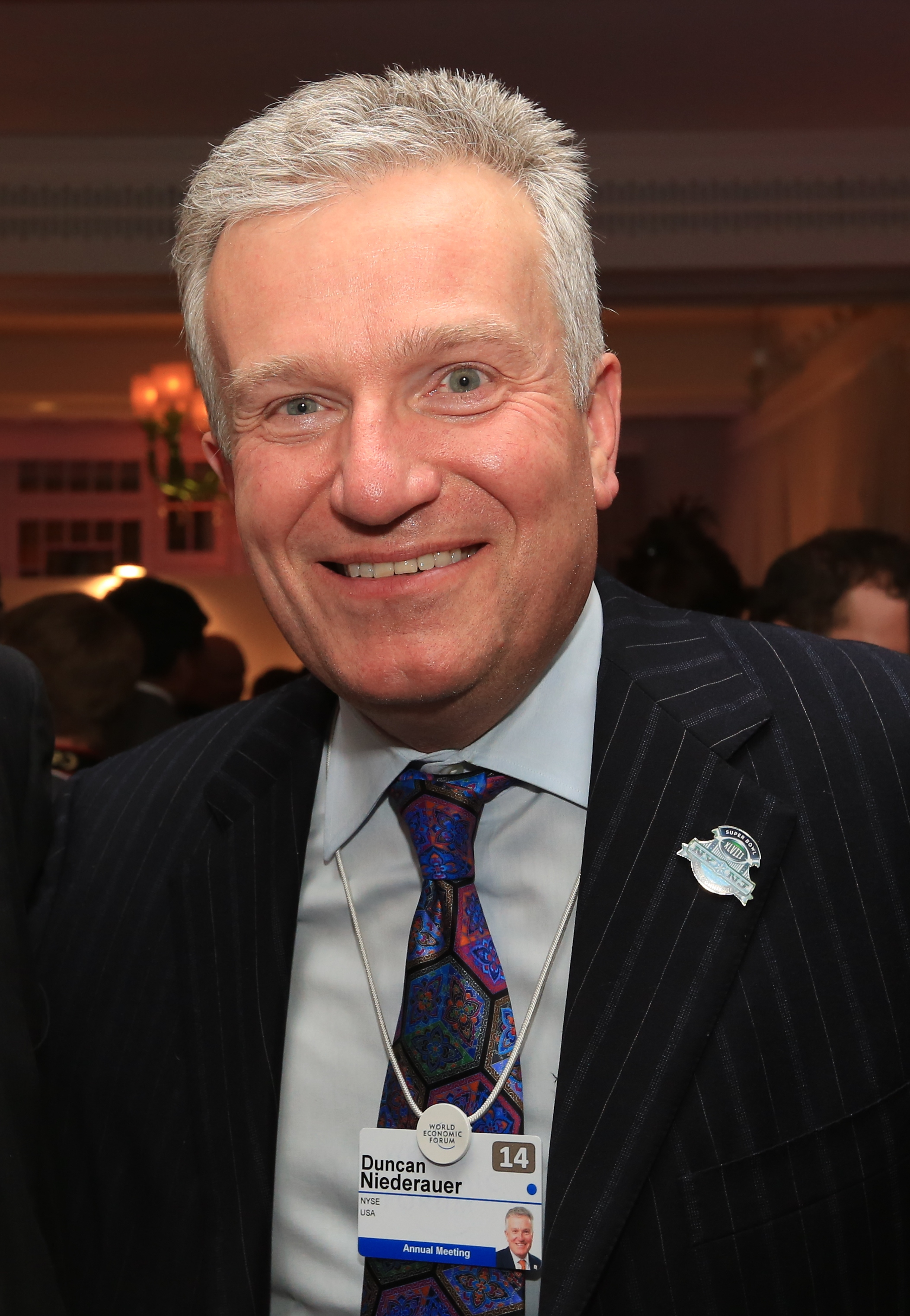
- Niederauer in 2014
- Education: Colgate University (BA); Emory University (MBA)
- Occupations: Owner and Chairman of Venezia FC

Duncan L. Niederauer CBE is an American businessman. He served as the chief executive officer of NYSE Euronext until 2014 and is the owner and chairman of Venezia FC.

== Early life ==
Niederauer graduated from Colgate University with a Bachelor of Arts degree. He received a Master of Business Administration from the Goizueta Business School at Emory University.

== Career ==
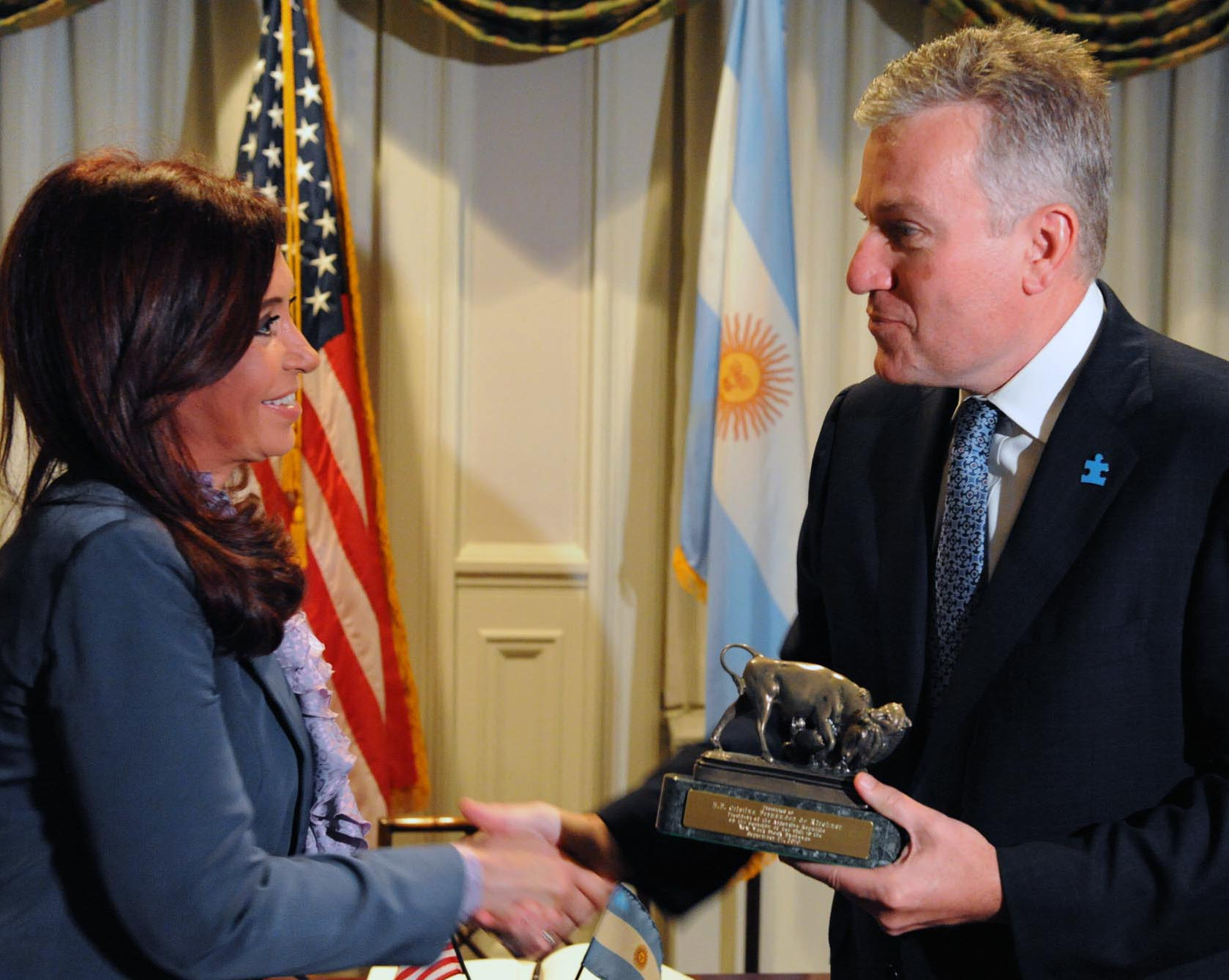
President of Argentina Cristina Fernandez with New York Stock Exchange CEO Duncan Niederauer at New York for More money

Niederauer joined Goldman Sachs in 1985, and became a partner in 2000. From 2002 to 2004, he served on the Board of Manager of Archipelago Holdings. He joined the board of Eze Castle Software in 1981 and served on the board of the Depository Trust & Clearing Corporation until 2008. Niederauer joined NYSE Euronext as a director in April 2007. In December 2007, he was appointed chief executive officer and a director of NYSE Euronext. In 2013, Niederauer was honored as Commander of the Most Excellent Order of the British Empire (CBE) for "services to the Northern Ireland economy". In 2014, Niederauer retired from NYSE Euronext.

Niederauer is a member of G100, a private group of chief executives of the world's largest companies, and the British-American Business Council International Advisory Committee.

In 2019, he became president of Venezia FC. He is a founding partner of Communitas Capital.

== Philanthropy ==
Niederauer is a member of Partnership for New York City, the Committee Encouraging Corporate Philanthropy, the Shanghai International Financial Advisory Committee, The American Ireland Fund, the Museum of American Finance, and Fundação Dom Cabral in Brazil. He also serves on the Board of Trustees of his alma mater, Colgate University, where he gave the commencement speech in 2013. He also serves on the Boards of Operation HOPE and the Congressional Medal of Honor Foundation.

== Personal life ==
Niederauer is married and has three children. He lives in Far Hills, New Jersey.
