= United Egg Producers =

United Egg Producers (UEP) is a farmer cooperative working collaboratively to address legislative, regulatory and advocacy issues impacting egg production – through active farmer-member leadership, a unified voice and partnership across the U.S. agricultural community.

== History ==
Egg producers’ concern over the volatility of prices due to overproduction during the early 1960s was the impetus for the creation of UEP. To combat these intermittent price fluctuations, producers began by coordinating egg production through several regional marketing associations, including the Northwest Egg Producers (NWEP); the Western Egg Company (WESTCO); the Southwest Egg Producers (SWEP); the National Egg Company (NECO), which focused on the Southeastern United States; and the Northeast Egg Marketing Association (NEMA). This approach was unsuccessful in coordinating interregional egg production, and as a result, instability continued. Hence, NWEP, WESTCO, SWEP, NECO, and NEMA came together to form UEP as the first national association of egg farmers on October 19, 1968. UEP's five member associations tasked the new organization with three primary objectives, including 1) monitoring and controlling egg prices, 2), providing national leadership to American egg farmers and 3) developing marketing plans.

UEP made great strides in accomplishing each of these tasks within its first decade in existence. In May 1971, UEP helped establish the nonprofit corporation responsible for determining and setting the market value of eggs known as the Egg Clearinghouse. The creation of this organization effectively shifted the responsibility of monitoring and controlling egg prices from UEP to the ECI. In April 1973, UEP acted on its marketing responsibility by creating the American Egg Board, which encourages the consumption of eggs and egg products through the publication of nutritional information and advertising. In 1978, UEP hired the law firm of McLeod, Watkinson & Miller to represent UEP's interests in Washington, D.C., and founded the United Egg Association Political Action Committee (EggPAC), which gave contributions to candidates running for state and national offices.

UEP's first foray into creating animal welfare standards occurred during the 1980s. In June 1982, in collaboration with the Humane Society of the United States (HSUS), UEP developed a set of animal welfare guidelines and published them in a pamphlet entitled “Recommended Guidelines of Husbandry Practices for Humane Handling.” The following year, UEP returned to their primary objectives by setting up a subsidiary organization for companies that break and further process eggs, known as United Egg Association Further Processors (UEAFP). For the rest of this decade, UEP focused primarily on managing its many subsidiaries, dealing with consumer health concerns, and attempting to stabilize the American egg market.

== Response to letter writing campaign ==
A spokesperson for the UEP was asked to comment by the Associated Press after the animal rights group Mercy for Animals sent letters of protest to the fifty largest grocers in the US demanding they include a label on egg cartons that says, "Warning: Male chicks are ground-up alive by the egg industry." The UEP called the campaign "almost a joke," and said that the group's ultimate aim was to stop egg consumption altogether. To coincide with the letter campaign, Mercy For Animals released a video showing male chicks being killed on the production line of an Iowa hatchery by being fed, alive, into a grinder. The hatchery claimed that the procedure, known in the industry as instantaneous euthanasia was in line with guidelines set up by the UEP.

== Price fixing lawsuit ==
In November 2023, the company was found liable in a lawsuit alleging that it colluded, along with Cal-Maine, Rose Acre Farms, and United States Egg Marketers, to reduce the supply of eggs and increase prices between 2004 and 2008. The plaintiffs in the case, a group of large food manufacturers led by Kraft Foods, originally filed the long-running lawsuit in 2011, but it did not reach trial until October 2023.

== See also ==
- American Egg Board
