= Rose Acre Farms =

Second largest egg producer in the United States

Rose Acre Farms, Inc.
- Type: Private
- Industry: Poultry farming
- Founder: David Rust
- Headquarters: Seymour, Indiana
- Key people: Tony Wesner, CEO & Chair of Board Terry Anderson, COO Marcus Rust, Chief Visionary Officer, former CEO
- Products: Eggs
- Revenue: $608.74 million
- Number of employees: 2,000
- Website: GoodEgg.com

Rose Acre Farms is the second-largest egg producer in the United States and employs more than 2,000 people. The company is based in Seymour, Indiana, and has facilities in seven states: Arizona, Georgia, Iowa, Illinois, Indiana, Missouri and North Carolina, plus joint ventures in Colorado and Hawaii. Rose Acre Farms is one of several producers that annually donate approximately 30,000 hard boiled eggs to the U.S. government for use at the White House Easter Egg Roll.

In 2013 the company began a 30-year effort to refit its facilities to cage-free standards.

In 2018, Rose Acre Farms donated $200,000 for a new animal science complex on the nearby campus of Purdue University at Lafayette, Indiana.

In April 2018, Rose Acre Farms announced that, due to concerns over Salmonella, they would be voluntarily recalling more than 200 million eggs which originated at its facility in Hyde County, North Carolina. All recalled eggs were conventional eggs from hens raised in battery cage facilities. The Food and Drug Administration (FDA) investigation found, among other things, numerous rodents in the manure pits below the battery cages. It was the largest egg recall in the country since 2010.

Rose Acre Farms partially owns Opal Foods which received $24 million in payments from the USDA to cover the cost of flocks exterminated due to avian influenza since 2022, a federal response known as “indemnity payments.” This facility used ventilation shutdown plus to kill their flocks. In July 2024 their Roggen, CO facility had another outbreak of avian influenza and killed 1.8 million birds in response.

Former board chairman John Rust stepped down in favor of his brother and the company's CEO, Marcus, in September 2023, to focus on a campaign running for the US Senate. Three months later, the company was found liable in a lawsuit alleging that it colluded, along with Cal-Maine, United Egg Producers, and United States Egg Marketers, to reduce the supply of eggs and increase prices between 2004 and 2008. The plaintiffs in the case, a group of large food manufacturers led by Kraft Foods, originally filed the long-running lawsuit in 2011, but it did not reach trial until October 2023.

In October 2024, the company announced that Tony Wesner, former Chief Operating Officer, was elected as Chief Executive Officer and Chairman of the Board of Directors. Wesner succeeded Marcus Rust as Chief Executive Officer and Chairman of the Board. Rust has taken an advisory role with the family-owned company, and will serve as the new Chief Visionary Officer. Terry Anderson, former Vice President of Operations, is now the Chief Operating Officer.
