= Cal-Maine =

Egg producer in Jackson, Mississippi, U.S.

Cal-Maine Foods, Inc.
- Type: Public
- Traded as: Nasdaq: CALM; S&P 600 component
- Founded: 1957; 69 years ago
- Headquarters: Ridgeland, Mississippi, U.S.
- Key people: Sherman Miller, CEO
- Revenue: ▼US$2.91 billion (2026)
- Net income: ▼US$317 million (2026)
- Total assets: ▲US$1.21 billion (2020)
- Total equity: ▲US$1.01 billion (2020)
- Number of employees: 3,461 (May 30, 2020)
- Website: calmainefoods.com

Cal-Maine Foods, Inc. is an American fresh egg producer based in Ridgeland, Mississippi. As of 2024, it was the largest egg producer in the United States. Its eggs are sold under several different brand names, including Egg-Land's Best, Land O'Lakes, Farmhouse Eggs, Sunups, Sunny Meadow, and 4-Grain. The company was founded in 1957 by Fred R. Adams, Jr., whose family owns a controlling interest in the company, which is publicly traded on the NASDAQ stock exchange.

== Recent history ==
The company's size is largely due to its acquisition of at least 25 other egg-producing businesses over the years. As of 2025, they produce and sell about 13 billion eggs each year, or about 20% of all commercially produced eggs in the US.

On May 1, 2012, Cal-Maine announced a joint venture between the cooperative Egg-Land's Best and Land O'Lakes. Cal-Maine was the largest franchisee of Egg-Land's Best and one of the company's 13 shareholders. As of 2011, 16 percent of Cal-Maine egg sales were Egg-Land's Best.

In 2018, an investigation at Lake Wales Farm by the animal rights group Animal Recovery Mission (ARM) indicated that chickens suffered inhumane living conditions and abuse by employees. After further investigation by the Polk County sheriff's department and the United States Department of Agriculture (USDA), it was found that the farm had followed American Veterinary Medical Association (AVMA) protocols for euthanizing poultry. No confirmation of abuse was found.

According to the San Francisco Chronicle, in response to the COVID-19 pandemic, in the spring of 2020, Cal-Maine increased egg prices over 300%, from $1 to $3.44 per dozen. This triggered at least one lawsuit challenging the price jump as unjustified, since there had not been an actual supply chain interruption. The lawsuit was dismissed in August 2020.

Early in the morning of December 17, 2020, a fire destroyed two barns at Cal-Maine's Dade City, Florida facilities. The fire killed over 240,000 chickens, including 120,000 pullets; the financial loss was estimated to be over $1 million.

In 2021, Cal-Maine moved its headquarters from Jackson, Mississippi, to Ridgeland, Mississippi.

In November 2023, the company was found liable in a lawsuit alleging that it colluded, along with Rose Acre Farms, United Egg Producers, and United States Egg Marketers, to reduce the supply of eggs and increase prices between 2004 and 2008. The plaintiffs in the case, a group of large food manufacturers led by Kraft Foods, originally filed the long-running lawsuit in 2011, but it did not reach trial until October 2023.

In March 2024, Cal-Maine acquired a broiler processing plant, hatchery and feed mill in Dexter, Missouri, from the American multinational food processing corporation, Tyson Foods for an undisclosed amount. In June 2024, a group of poultry farmers filed a lawsuit against Cal-Maine and Tyson Foods, alleging that the companies had conspired to prevent a competing meatpacking company from purchasing the Dexter facility in violation of Missouri's antitrust laws.

Cal-Maine Foods received $44.8 million in taxpayer funded USDA Indemnity payments for exterminating flocks due to avian influenza. The birds were killed using the controversial killing method known as ventilation shutdown plus.

In 2025, watchdog journalism complained to the US federal government that Cal-Maine and other large egg producers might be engaged in profiteering and collusion from the bird flu outbreak at the expense of small farmers, which caused a national egg shortage and drove up the commodity price of eggs. This was prompted by higher profits and the fact that Cal-Maine hens had not died from bird flu. The US Department of Justice Antitrust Division began investigating Cal-Maine.

In June 2026, the Justice Department and 17 states reached a proposed settlement with Cal-Maine and two other egg producers over allegations that the companies had coordinated bids submitted to an egg-price reporting service, artificially inflating egg prices between 2022 and 2025. Under the proposed settlement, the three producers agreed collectively to pay $3.3 million and donate 53 million eggs to food banks and other nonprofit organizations. The companies did not admit wrongdoing, and the settlement remained subject to court approval.

== Principal subsidiaries ==
- Cal-Maine Farms, Inc.
- Southern Equipment Distributors, Inc.
- South Texas Applicators, Inc.
- Cal-Maine Partnership, Ltd.
- CMF of Kansas, LLCads 2004
