= Parallel Bus Interface =

Connector type for Atari computers

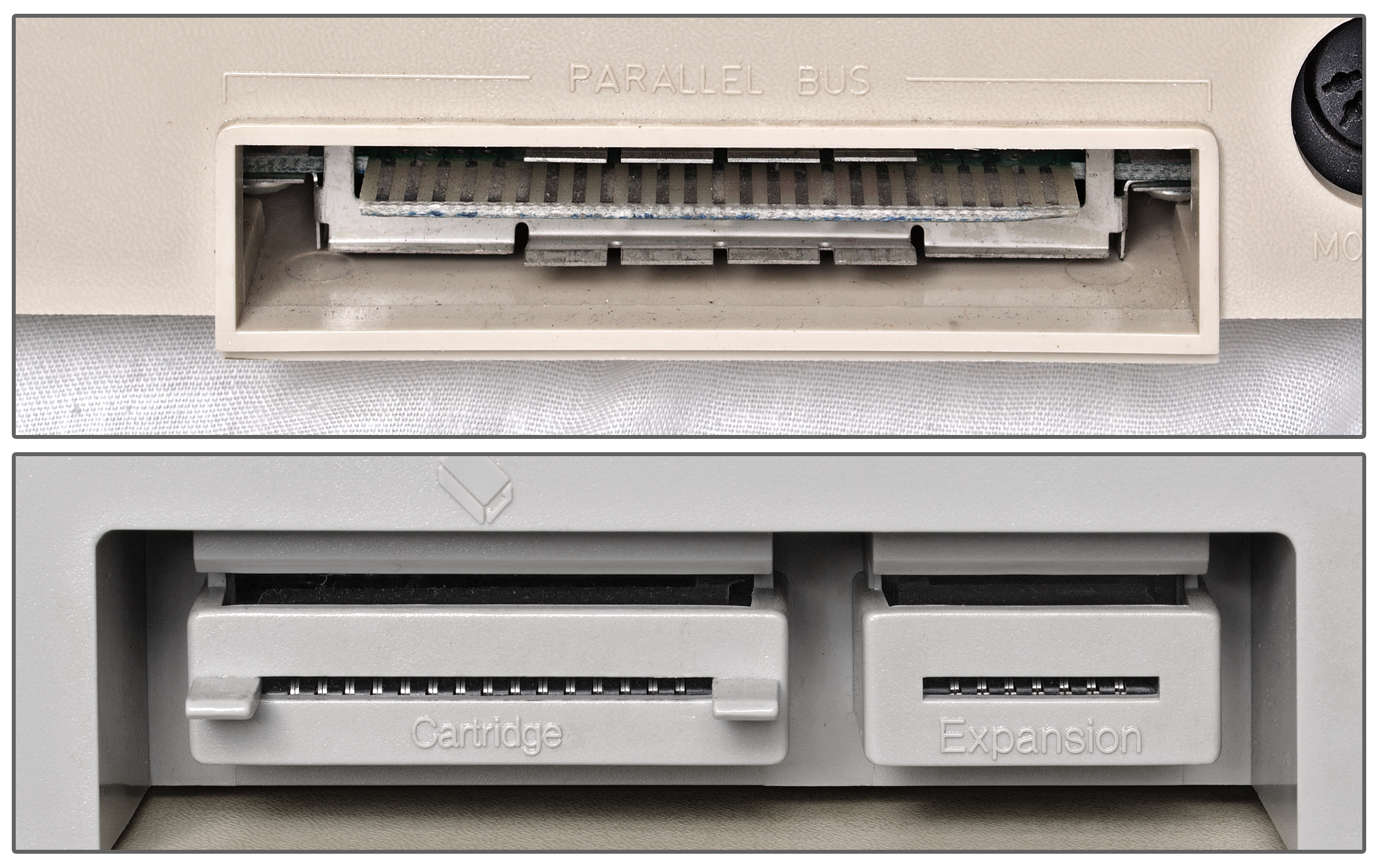
Parallel Bus Interface (above) and Enhanced Cartridge Interface (below, with cartridge socket)

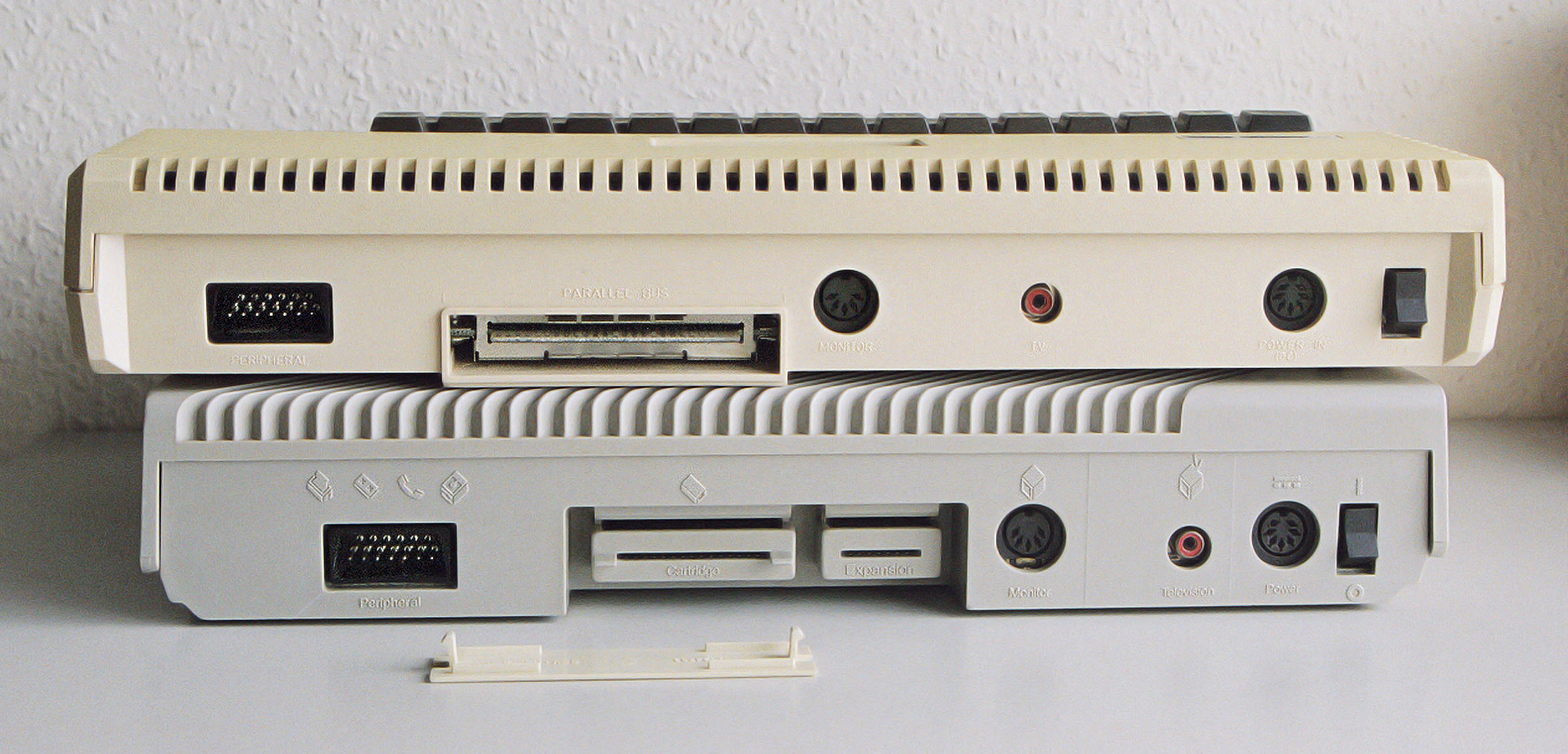
European 800XL with Parallel Bus Interface visible (above, with cover removed) and 130XE with Enhanced Cartridge Interface (below)

The Parallel Bus Interface, or PBI, is a 50-pin port found on some XL models of the Atari 8-bit computers. It provides unbuffered, direct connection to the system bus lines (address, data, control), running at the same speed as the 6502 CPU. The 600XL and 800XL, along with the unreleased 1400XL and 1450XLD have a PBI interface.

The Enhanced Cartridge Interface, or ECI, is a modified version of the PBI designed to be smaller and less expensive to implement. Many of the pins in the PBI are duplicated in the 30-pin cartridge slot, so ECI was limited to only those 14 pins in the PBI that were not in the cartridge slot. Placed side-by-side on the back of the computer, devices plugged into both at the same time to provide the same electrical interface as the PBI. The ECI is found on late production units of the 65XE, the 130XE, and the 800XE.

== Details ==
The PBI is implemented as a rectangular 50-pin edge connector on the back of XL machines. The pins include all 16 address lines (A0 through A15) and 8 data lines (D0 through D7). Other pins include various electrical supplies, clock signals, interrupts, memory strobes, and even an analog audio input.

As many of these pins were already implemented as part of the already-existing 30-pin ROM cartridge slots on Atari machines, the XE series re-implemented the PBI to include only those pins that the PBI had but the cartridge slot didn't. The resulting connector contained only 14 pins, mostly the address pins A13 though A15, and the various sound and signal pins of the PBI. The ECI slot was placed beside the cartridge slot, allowing a single connector to be inserted into both connectors and re-create the functionality of the entire PBI.

== Pinout ==
Parallel Bus Interface (PBI) - looking at the back
1	3	5	7	9	11	13	15	17	19	21	23	25	27	29	31	33	35	37	39	41	43	45	47	49
2	4	6	8	10	12	14	16	18	20	22	24	26	28	30	32	34	36	38	40	42	44	46	48	50

Parallel Bus Interface (PBI) - Pinout
Pin	TOP	Pin	BOTTOM
1	GND Ground	2	External select
3	A0 Address output	4	A1
5	A2	6	A3
7	A4	8	A5
9	A6	10	GND
11	A7	12	A8
13	A9	14	A10
15	A11	16	A12
17	A13	18	A14
19	GND	20	A15
21	D0 Data (bidirectional)	22	D1
23	D2	24	D3
25	D4	26	D5
27	D6	28	D7
29	GND	30	GND
31	Phase 2 clock output	32	GND
33	NC Reserved	34	Reset output
35	(IRQ) Interrupt request	36	Ready input
37	NC	38	External decoder output
39	NC	40	Refresh output
41	Column address output	42	GND
43	MPD Math pack disable input	44	Row address strobe
45	GND	46	Latch read/write out
47	NC (+5V on 600XL only)	48	NC (+5V on 600XL only, used for 1064)
49	Audio input	50	GND

== Devices ==
- Atari 1064 Memory Module - Designed specifically for the 600XL, it upgraded the memory of the 600XL to 64kB. Only parallel bus device released by Atari.
- Atari 1090 Expansion System - Designed to give expansion slots to the XL computers.
- ICD Multi I/O Board - Hooked up to either a PBI or ECI connection. Featured a RAMdisk, parallel port, serial port, print spooler and a hard disk interface.
- Black Box - The Black Box by CSS hooks up to either PBI or ECI connection. Featured a SCSI interface, a serial port, parallel port, floppy drive interface and a built-in menu system.
- SupraDrive - an early SCSI disk drive.
- Karin Maxi, a parallel floppy disk drive.
- KMK/JŻ IDE (a.k.a. IDEa), an ATA host adapter ().
- Turbo Freezer XL/XE, a freezer with onboard ROM including a monitor/debugger and RAM expansion (re-released 2005 and 2011 by ABBUC).
- IDE2ECI
- RAM320XL for the PBI and RAM320XE/576 for the ECI external RAM expansions.
- AVGCART and SUBCART - universal cartridges which can connect to the PBI or ECI with a cable to provide enhanced functionality.
