= Engine Components Inc. =

Engine Components International, Inc. (ECI) is a private aviation piston engine manufacturer. It was founded in 1943 as Pennington Channelcromium Co. to support the Army Air Force and Navy during World War II.

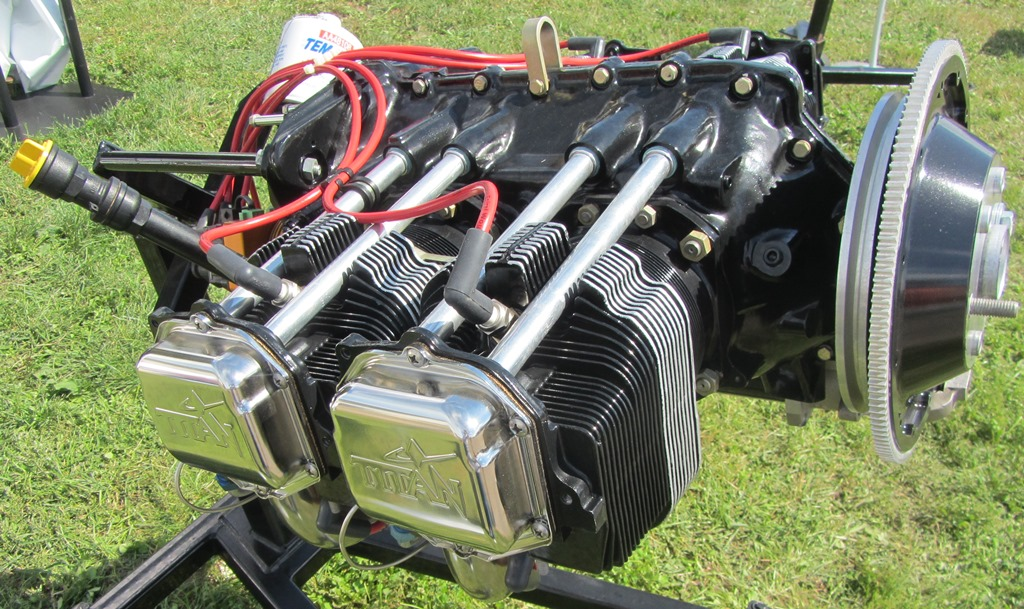
ECI Titan Engine
