= Emergency care instructor =

Medical education occupation

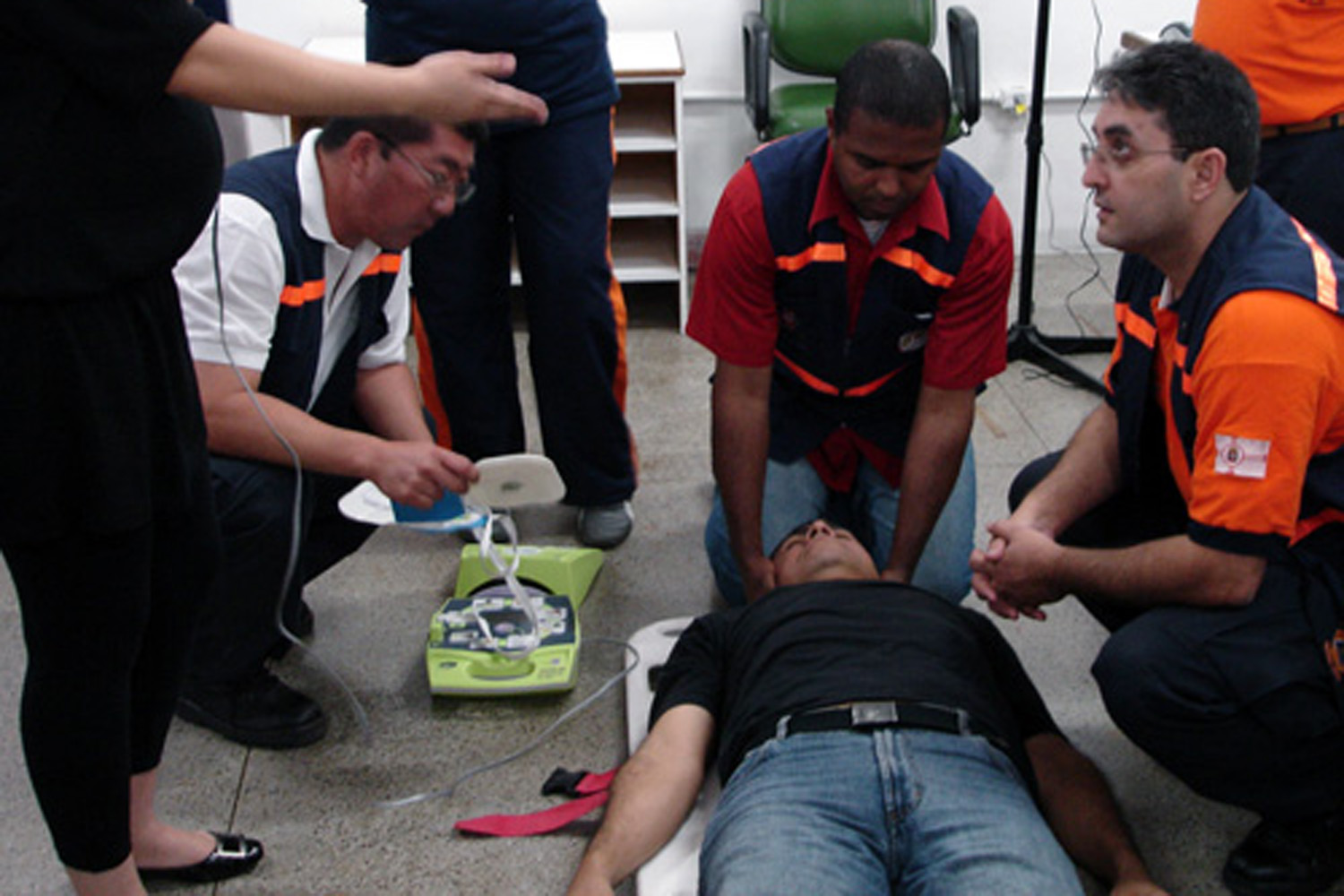
- An emergency care instructor teaches the use of a defibrillator

Occupation
- Occupation type: profession
- Activity sectors: Emergency care

Description
- Competencies: training skills, patience
- Education required: certificate of instructor course (+ other education, required for starting this course)
- Fields of employment: Emergency care courses

An emergency care instructor is a person who provides training in emergency care to civilians or military personnel. In order to qualify, a person must undergo appropriate courses, and have a certification level not lower (usually at least one level higher) than that to be taught. Often, experience with the provision of such care is required. If these requirements are met, the applicant will receive a certificate after completing training and fulfilling possible additional conditions.

Typically, upon certification it is necessary to hold a certain number of classes under the supervision of other instructors, and only after that may a new instructor teach courses on their own. The certificate must be renewed periodically.

Many first aid and medical care courses exist. They differ by:

- the level of care (cardiopulmonary resuscitation, first aid for bleeding, help for children, etc.);
- the minimum educational / professional level of students (persons without any prior medical training, persons with the qualification of first responder, EMT's of different levels, nurses, doctors);
- the specific circumstances in which care is provided (wilderness emergency medical training, tactical medical training, etc.)

== See also ==
- List of emergency medicine courses
