= Egg Clearinghouse =

Online egg marketplace

- Egg Clearinghouse, Inc.
- Abbreviation: ECI
- Nickname: The Wall Street of Eggs
- Founded at: St. Louis, Missouri
- Headquarters: Dover, New Hampshire, U.S.
- Services: Online marketplace for surplus eggs
- Website: www.eggs.org

The Egg Clearinghouse, Inc., also known as The Wall Street of Eggs or ECI, is an American online marketplace for eggs surplus to existing contracts. It is exclusive to egg producers and commercial egg purchasers. The prices used on ECI, even though only surplus eggs are traded, underpin egg prices more broadly.

ECI was created in a reaction to egg market instability and doubts about the existing egg trading system. It allows organizations involved in eggs to offload excess and find needed eggs; every day, it handles the trade of millions of such eggs. In addition, through price discovery, it indirectly helps stabilize egg pricing. However, as ECI prices are linked to egg prices in general, manipulating prices on ECI can and has led to changes in general egg prices.

In 2026, the United States Department of Justice filed suit alleging that three egg producers colluded to raise egg prices on ECI. The producers settled the case with a joint payment of $3.3 million and a donation of 50 million eggs to food banks.

== History ==
In the 1960s, egg prices in the United States were determined through market conditions and the nature of bids for eggs on the New York and Chicago mercantile exchanges. These prices were regional, not national; an egg price for New York would not apply in Los Angeles. But there were certain problems with this system, namely that the eggs used to determine these regional prices were not necessarily reflective of the broader egg trade in terms of sample size and of egg type.

In April 1970, after being under scrutiny for monopolistic egg trading tendencies, the aforementioned exchanges exited the practice of egg trading at the behest of the Commodity Exchange Authority. The market, up until then, was seen by the CEA and many farmers as vulnerable to manipulation. But the retreat of the exchanges, even while the egg trade there had been limited, gave way to a world without ways to trade or price eggs.

Subsequently, in May 1971, Egg Clearinghouse was formed as per the recommendations of a congressionally commissioned study conducted in 1969. It saw trouble during its first three months, however, and so Raymond Delano, who had himself made earlier attempts to link agricultural products to markets, took the helm. He then eliminated the hand-graded egg trade in favor of weighing egg cases, which saved time and thus allowed ECI to handle more egg trades in general; this righted the ECI ship. ECI struggled again in the 1980s due to instability in the egg industry and saw new management in 1984.

Through price discovery, it smoothed out egg prices. This was made more efficient through the use of computers to handle bids and pricing, which ECI pioneered; this also allowed traders to find counterparts more easily.

ECI had its first offices in St. Louis, Missouri, but moved to Delano's basement in Durham, New Hampshire four months later. Its board, at the time, included the founder of Cal-Maine, the largest U.S. egg producer. By 1978, ECI was responsible in part for the supply of more than 4.2 million eggs a day. In 2024, ECI helped supply more than 2.6 billion shell eggs and 39 million pounds of egg product.

During the 2020s outbreak of bird flu, commercial consumers and producers turned to ECI to fill orders; both bought eggs on the platform to resell.

== Operations ==
Participants in ECI pay monthly dues; said participants comprise egg and egg product producers, packers, distributors, and brokers. Only these organizations are allowed to trade on ECI. In 1978, these dues were less than fifty dollars.

ECI and its data are crucial in setting egg prices; the results of its trades are public, while the prices of most eggs, being under private contract, are not. The prices reported on ECI, along with data collected from egg industry parties and self-reported trades, are collected by Expana, a research firm formerly known as Urner Barry. Expana, in turn, publishes benchmark prices for eggs. In addition, prices in private contracts are often based on the benchmarks. Through this, prices on ECI effectively determine the market value of eggs. There is, however, some doubt as to whether prices as they are calculated are truly free from manipulation given that participants in ECI are able to both buy and sell eggs, potentially affecting their prices. Then too the Expana method of price calculation is opaque.

Through ECI, parties bid for and sell eggs without knowing each other's identities, which are only revealed after agreements are reached. ECI collects a commission of one cent per dozen eggs traded. Eggs available are from production surplus to existing contracts. While that surplus is only a small part of the greater egg trade, ECI acts as a resource for parties in need of additional eggs to fulfill obligations. This is the primary function of ECI; price discovery is secondary.

Eggs and egg products traded on ECI are divided by region, type, color, and size.

ECI is based in Dover, New Hampshire, where it has been since at least 1996. However, it is incorporated in Delaware and has its registered office there. ECI's president as of 2025 is Alan Munroe, an experienced trader.

=== Price manipulation ===
Prior to the 1984 reorganization of ECI and concurrent with the aforementioned egg industry instability, some ECI traders attempted to unduly influence the Urner Barry egg prices. A 1985 study concluded that, from 1979 to 1982, Urner Barry prices were leading indicators of ECI; the function of price discovery had failed and that ECI prices simply tended to the UB prices. This was in contrast to a 1980 study with overlapping authorship regarding the 1977–78 period wherein ECI worked appropriately. After ECI reorganization and a change in Urner Barry calculation methods, a 1997 study found that prices on ECI had returned to being a leading indicator of Urner Barry prices and thus its price discovery role reattained.

In 2026, the United States Department of Justice filed suit in the Northern District of Iowa alleging that three egg producers, Hickman's Egg Ranch, Versova, and Cal-Maine, colluded to raise egg prices. According to the complaint, the mechanism of the manipulation was threefold: the producers would bid for eggs on ECI at a price above the market benchmark; separately, they engaged each other in private egg trades at artificially high prices, which went into the benchmark calculation; they also lobbied Urner Barry both to raise its benchmarks and to weigh their bids more in their analysis.

The accused parties settled for $3.3 million and a collective donation of 50 million eggs to food banks.
