= Eze Castle Integration =

Global IT consulting and cybersecurity company

ECI
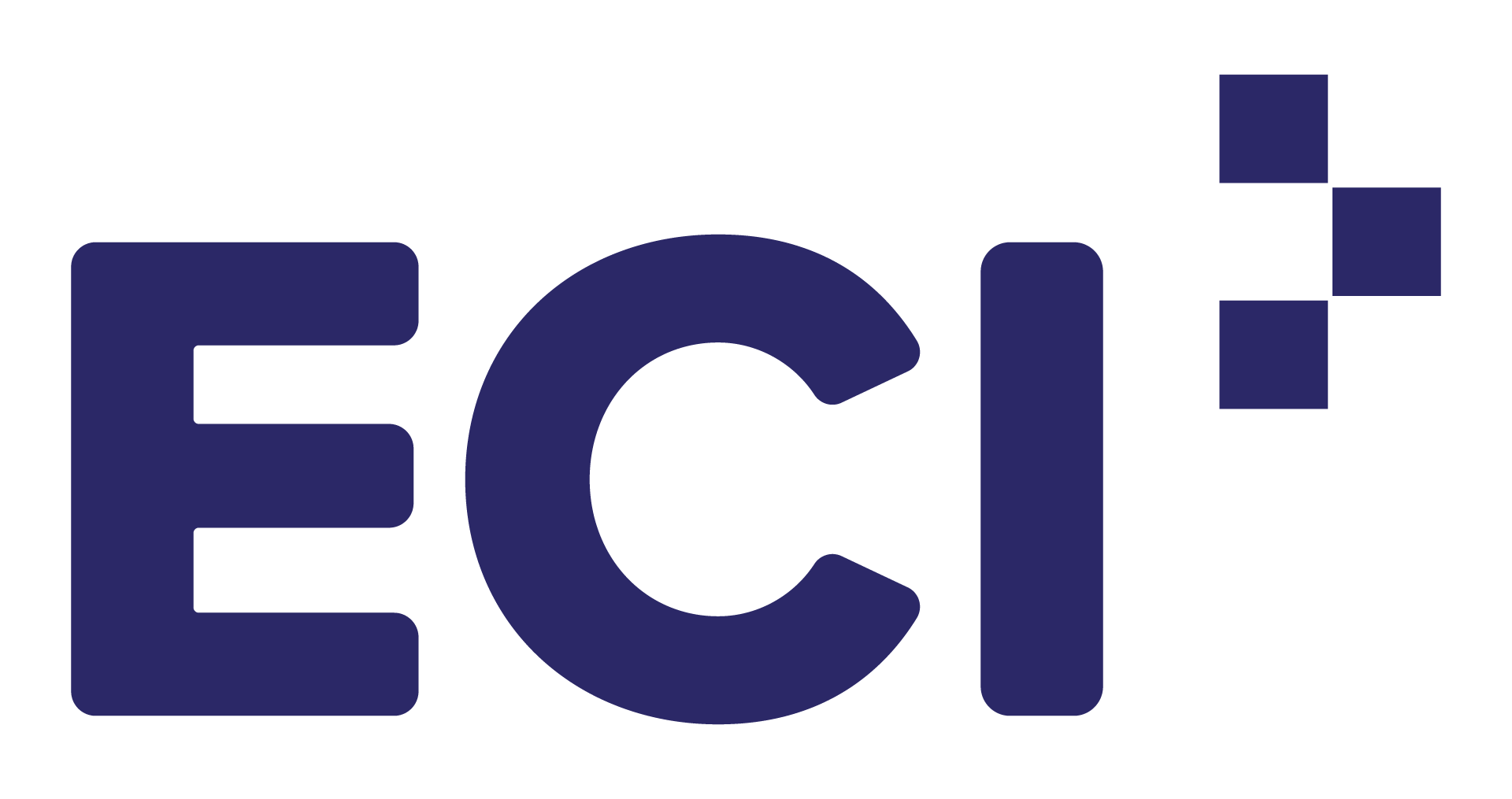
- Type: Private
- Industry: Managed services, Cybersecurity, Cloud computing, Artificial intelligence
- Founded: 1995
- Headquarters: New York, NY, United States
- Key people: Jeff Schmidt – Chief Executive Officer; John Cahaly – Executive Chairman; Rich Itri – Chief Innovation Officer; Andy Breton – Chief Financial Officer
- Products: ELLA (AI platform), Eze Private Cloud, ECI Managed Services
- Services: Managed IT, Cybersecurity, Cloud solutions, AI & Data, Digital Transformation
- Number of employees: ~900 (2026)
- Website: www.eci.com

ECI (formerly Eze Castle Integration) is a global managed services provider specializing in cybersecurity, cloud computing, artificial intelligence, and digital transformation for mid-market financial services organizations.

The company serves more than 1,000 clients worldwide, including hedge funds, private equity firms, venture capital firms, and asset managers collectively managing over $3 trillion in assets under management.

Founded in 1995 as Eze Castle Consulting in Boston, Massachusetts, the company was among the earliest IT service providers focused on the alternative investment industry. The company is known for developing early cloud infrastructure solutions for hedge funds and for launching ELLA, a secure large language model application designed for the alternative investment market.

The company operates globally with offices in North America, Europe, and Asia.

== History ==
=== Founding and early years (1995–2007) ===
Sean McLaughlin and John Cahaly founded Eze Castle Consulting in 1995. The company was named after Èze, a village in the French Riviera.

Eze Castle Consulting initially provided IT services to early-stage hedge funds in the Boston area before expanding to New York City, San Francisco, and Greenwich, Connecticut in the late 1990s.

In 2000, the firm was restructured into two independent companies, Eze Castle Software and Eze Castle Integration; Eze Castle Integration became a systems integration company focused on the financial services sector.

By 2004, the company had grown to approximately 120 employees.

=== Cloud development and international expansion (2007–2017) ===
Throughout the late 2000s, the company introduced technology products including Eze Vault, Eze Disaster Recovery, and Eze Managed Suites.

The company also launched Eze Cloud, a private cloud platform designed for hedge funds.

By this period, the company supported approximately 450 U.S.-based hedge funds, including 81 firms managing over $1 billion in assets.

The company expanded internationally, opening offices in London in 2007 and Chicago in 2008. Additional offices were opened in Singapore in 2010 and Hong Kong in 2011.

In 2010, an affiliate company, Ledgex Systems LLC, was created to develop portfolio management software for fund of hedge funds.

=== Private equity investment and acquisitions (2018–2020) ===
In 2018, private equity firm H.I.G. Capital made a significant investment in Eze Castle Integration.

At the time, the company had approximately 650 clients across the United States, the United Kingdom, and Asia.

In 2020, the company acquired Alphaserve Technologies.

Later that year, the company acquired NorthOut, Inc.

=== Rebrand and AI development (2021–present) ===
In 2021, Eze Castle Integration rebranded as ECI.

In December 2021, the company expanded into Canada.

In November 2023, ECI launched ELLA (ECI Large Language Application), a managed AI platform designed for financial services firms operating in regulated environments.

In 2025, the company introduced a client health dashboard providing real-time IT and security visibility.

== Products and services ==
=== ELLA ===
ELLA (ECI Large Language Application) is an artificial intelligence platform that enables financial services organizations to use large language models within a governed and compliant framework.

The platform incorporates data loss prevention controls, retrieval-augmented generation, and monitoring tools designed to support secure AI adoption in regulated environments.

=== Managed services ===
ECI provides managed IT services including cloud infrastructure management, help desk support, Microsoft 365 administration, endpoint management, and enterprise monitoring.

The company also offers cybersecurity services such as security information and event management (SIEM), extended detection and response (XDR), vulnerability management, and virtual Chief Information Security Officer (vCISO) services.

== Recognition ==
ECI has received multiple industry awards and recognitions.

- 2020: Best Cybersecurity Provider and Best Outsourcing Provider, Waters Rankings
- 2020: Best Use of Cloud Technology, HFM US Service Provider Awards
- 2025: Named to the Hedgeweek US Awards shortlist for Best Managed Services Provider
- 2025: Named to the Cloudtango Global100 list of managed service providers

== See also ==
- Managed services
- Cybersecurity
- Cloud computing
