= Jagged array =

Multidimensional data structure

Memory layout of a jagged array

In computer science, a jagged array, also known as a ragged array or irregular array is an array of arrays of which the member arrays can be of different lengths, producing rows of jagged edges when visualized as output. In contrast, two-dimensional arrays are always rectangular so jagged arrays should not be confused with multidimensional arrays, but the former is often used to emulate the latter.

Jagged array can be implemented with Iliffe vector data structure in languages such as Java, PHP, Python (multidimensional lists), Ruby, C#.NET, Visual Basic.NET, Perl, JavaScript, Objective-C, Swift, and Atlas Autocode.

== Examples ==
In C# and Java jagged arrays can be created with the following code:

int[][] c;
c = new int[2][]; // creates 2 rows
c[0] = new int[5]; // 5 columns for row 0
c[1] = new int[3]; // create 3 columns for row 1

In C and C++, a jagged array can be created (on the stack) using the following code:

int jagged_row0[] = {0,1};
int jagged_row1[] = {1,2,3};
int *jagged[] = { jagged_row0, jagged_row1 };

In C/C++, jagged arrays can also be created (on the heap) with an array of pointers:

int *jagged[5];

jagged[0] = malloc(sizeof(int) * 10);
jagged[1] = malloc(sizeof(int) * 3);

In C++/CLI, jagged array can be created with the code:

using namespace System;
int main()
{
    array<array<double> ^> ^ Arrayname = gcnew array <array<double> ^> (4); // array contains 4 
    //elements
    return 0;
}

In Fortran, a jagged array can be created using derived types with allocatable component(s):

type :: Jagged_type
    integer, allocatable :: row(:)
end type Jagged_type
type(Jagged_type) :: Jagged(3)
Jagged(1)%row = [1]
Jagged(2)%row = [1,2]
Jagged(3)%row = [1,2,3]

In Python, jagged arrays are not native but one can use list comprehensions to create a multi-dimensional list which supports any dimensional matrix:

multi_list_3d = [[[] for i in range(3)] for i in range(3)]
# Produces: [[[], [], []], [[], [], []], [[], [], []]]

multi_list_5d = [[[] for i in range(5)] for i in range(5)]
# Produces: [[[], [], [], [], []], [[], [], [], [], []], [[], [], [], [], []], [[], [], [], [], []], [[], [], [], [], []]]

== See also ==
- Variable-length array
- Iliffe vector
