= Wang 4000 =

1967 minicomputer from Wang Laboratories

- Manufacturer: Wang Laboratories
- Released: 1967
- Discontinued: 1968
- Successor: Wang 3300

The Wang 4000 was the first programmable computer system from Wang Laboratories, released in 1967.

== Description ==
However, already in the spring of 1968, An Wang, seeing that he was not able to compete with the PDP-8, focused on a new computer — model 3300. It allowed the use of peripheral devices, in particular printers.
