= Wang 3300 =

1971 minicomputer from Wang Laboratories

- Manufacturer: Wang Laboratories
- Type: minicomputer
- Operating system: Wang T-BASIC
- Memory: up to 64 KB RAM
- Predecessor: Wang 4000
- Successor: Wang 2200

The Wang 3300 was a minicomputer released by Wang Laboratories in 1971.

== Description ==
Model with machine time sharing created between Wang 4000 and Wang 2200. Wang's first computer, the Wang 3300, was an 8-bit integrated circuit general-purpose minicomputer designed to be the central processor for a multi-terminal time-sharing system. Byte-oriented, it also provided a number of double-byte operand memory commands. Core memory ranged from 4,096 to 65,536 bytes in 4,096-byte increments. Up to 16 teletype terminals could be connect to one 3300. Wang claimed at the time that it was "the most easily operated minicomputer time-sharing system available" but it has become to be seen as a "false start" since programs, stored on paper tape, took up to 40 minutes to load and it only used the physical teletype terminals instead of CRTs.

Development began after hiring Rick Bensene in June 1968. The software was developed by PHI Computer Services, which Wang had purchased in 1968, on an IBM 360/65 emulating the 3300. The product was announced in February 1969 and shipped to its first customer on March 29, 1971.
