= File and stream I/O in C Sharp =

The C# programming language provides many classes and methods to perform file and stream input and output.

The most common stream classes used for file and stream I/O within the .NET Framework are listed below:

Class	Function
FileStream	Reading and writing to a standard file
IsolatedStorageFileStream	Reading and writing to a file in isolated storage
MemoryStream	Reading and writing to memory modeled as a stream
BufferedStream	Reading and writing to a stream using buffered I/O for improved thread performance
NetworkStream	Reading and writing to network sockets
PipeStream	Reading and writing over anonymous and named pipes
CryptoStream	Linking data streams to cryptographic transformations
