= Sequential access =

Computer memory concept

Sequential access compared to random access

Sequential access is a term describing a group of elements (such as data in a memory array or a disk file or on magnetic-tape data storage) being accessed in a predetermined, ordered sequence. It is the opposite of random access, the ability to access an arbitrary element of a sequence as easily and efficiently as any other at any time.

Sequential access is sometimes the only way of accessing the data, for example if it is on a tape. It may also be the access method of choice, for example if all that is wanted is to process a sequence of data elements in order.

== Definition ==
There is no consistent definition in computer science of sequential access or sequentiality. In fact, different sequentiality definitions can lead to different sequentiality quantification results. In spatial dimension, request size, stride distance, backward accesses, re-accesses can affect sequentiality. For temporal sequentiality, characteristics such as multi-stream and inter-arrival time threshold has impact on the definition of sequentiality.

In data structures, a data structure is said to have sequential access if one can only visit the values it contains in one particular order. The canonical example is the linked list. Indexing into a list that has sequential access requires O(n) time, where n is the index. As a result, many algorithms such as quicksort and binary search degenerate into bad algorithms that are even less efficient than their naive alternatives; these algorithms are impractical without random access. On the other hand, some algorithms, typically those that do not have index, require only sequential access, such as mergesort, and face no penalty.

== See also ==
- Direct-access storage device
- Queued sequential access method
- Sequential data
