= Catchword =

Word at foot of page that anticipates first word of next page

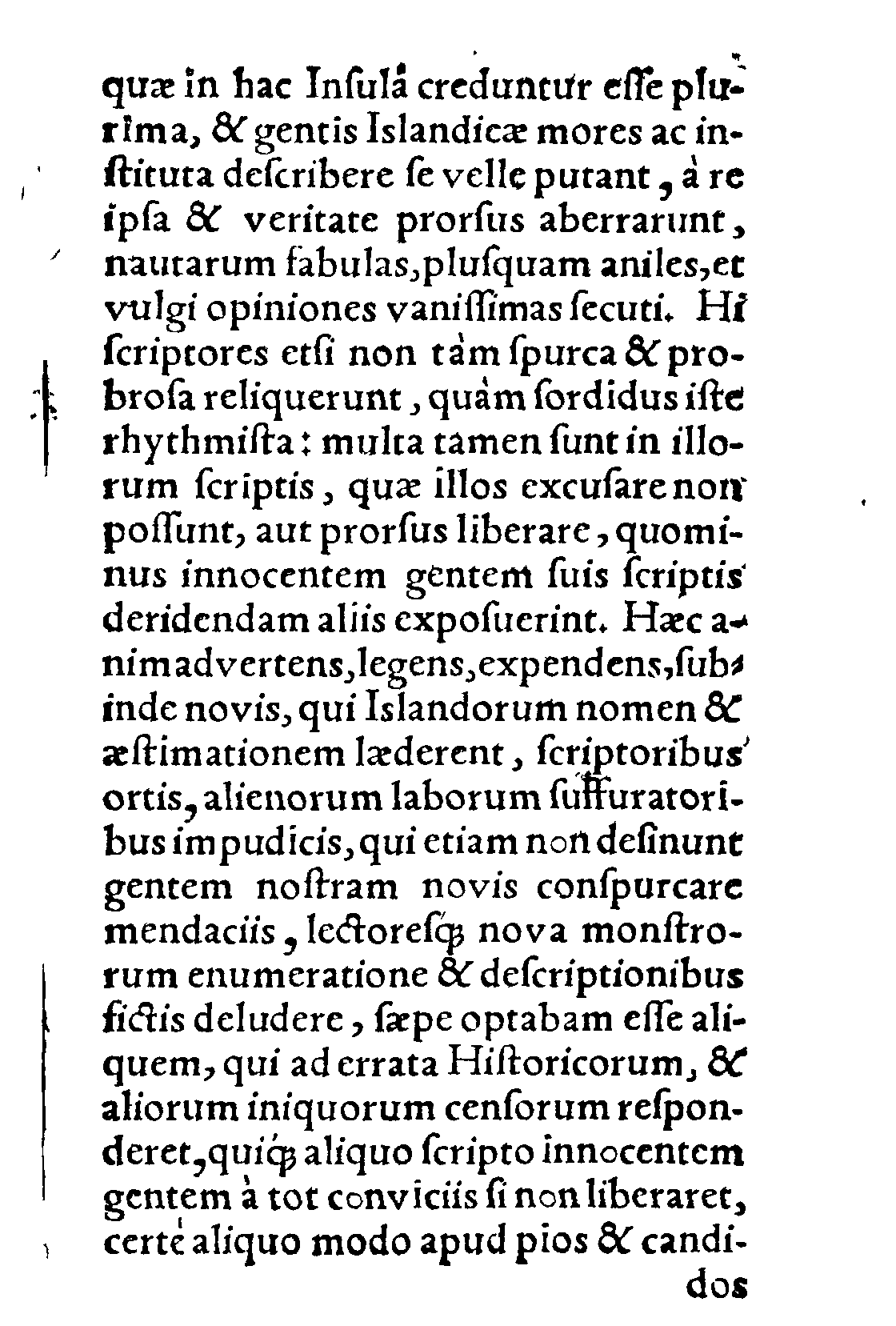
The catchword (in this case the last three letters "dos" of a divided word) is at the bottom of the page

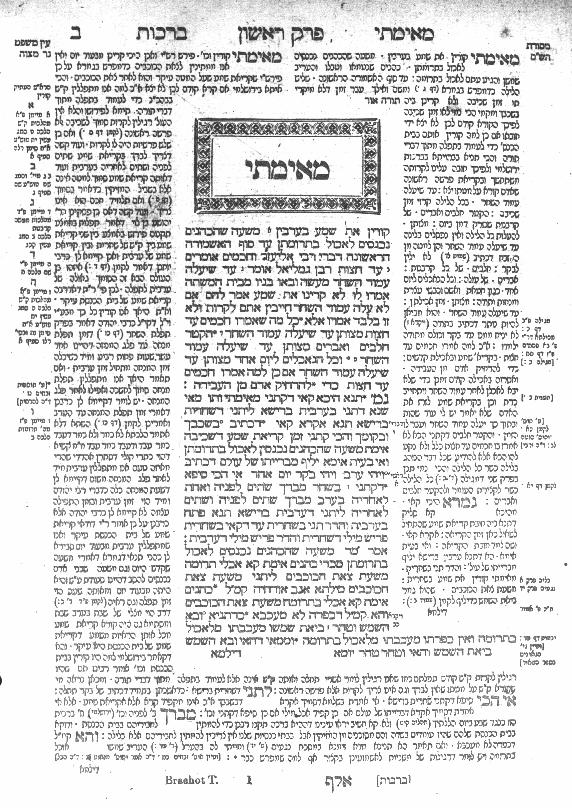
The first page of the Babylonian Talmud (Tractate Berachot, folio 2a). The catchword "דילמא" is found at the bottom of the Talmud text (center), and the commentaries of Rashi (center left) and the Tosafot (center right) as the word will begin each text on the next page, 2b.

A catchword is a word placed at the foot of a handwritten or printed page that is meant to be bound along with other pages in a book. The word anticipates the first word of the following page. It was meant to help the bookbinder or printer make sure that the leaves were bound in the right order or that the pages were set up in the press in the right order. Catchwords appear in some medieval manuscripts, and appear again in printed books late in the fifteenth century. The practice became widespread in the mid sixteenth century, and prevailed until the arrival of industrial printing techniques late in the eighteenth century.

Theodore Low Devinne's 1901 guide on Correct Composition had this to say:

For more than three centuries printers of books appended at the foot of every page the first word or syllable of the next page. This catchword was supposed to be needed by the reader to make clear the connection between the two pages; but the catchword is now out of use, and it is not missed.

== See also ==
- Reclamans
- Page numbering, a more modern system with analogous function but a non-homologous structure differing in that it defines order in terms of absolute position rather than by reference to the content of the properly following page
- Linked list, a homologous digital implementation of the concept whose analog implementations include the use of catchwords
