= Reclamans =

The last line of a text showing the first line of a subsequent text

In papyrus rolls and manuscripts, a reclamans (plural: reclamantes) is a catchline included at the end of a section of text showing the first line or sentence of the subsequent roll or codex, thus ensuring that the reader could quickly determine the proper order in which the particular work was to be read. The practice is well-attested in Homeric papyri, but it appears to have fallen into disuse in these texts around the 1st century AD. It seems very likely that the increased popularity of inscribing each roll with a book title precipitated the obsolescence of the reclamans. In the case of prose works, however, the practice continued to be used, and several medieval manuscripts of works like Herodotus' Histories and the Hippocratic Corpus include reclamantes.

== See also ==
- Catchword

== Bibliography ==
- Schironi, F. (2010), Τὸ Μέγα Βίβλιον: Book-Ends, End-Titles, and Coronides in Papyri with Hexametric Poetry, Durham, NC, ISBN 9780979975806.
- West, S. (1963), "Reclamantes in Greek Papyri", Scriptorium, 17 (2): 314–15, doi:10.3406/scrip.1963.3188.
