= Polynomial functor (type theory) =

In type theory, a polynomial functor (or container functor) is a kind of endofunctor of a category of types that is intimately related to the concept of inductive and coinductive types. Specifically, all W-types (resp. M-types) are (isomorphic to) initial algebras (resp. final coalgebras) of such functors.

Polynomial functors have been studied in the more general setting of a pretopos with Σ-types; this article deals only with the applications of this concept inside the category of types of a Martin-Löf style type theory.

== Definition ==
Let U be a universe of types, let A : U, and let B : A → U be a family of types indexed by A. The pair (A, B) is sometimes called a signature or a container. The polynomial functor associated to the container (A, B) is defined as follows:

$$\begin{align}
P : U &\longrightarrow U \\
X &\longmapsto \sum_{a:A} (B(a) \to X)
\end{align}$$

Any functor naturally isomorphic to P is called a container functor. The action of P on functions is defined by

$$\begin{align}
P : (X\to Y) &\longrightarrow (PX\to PY) \\
f \qquad &\longmapsto \left((a,g) \mapsto (a,g\circ f)\right)
\end{align}$$

Note that this assignment is only truly functorial in extensional type theories (see #Properties).

== Properties ==
In intensional type theories, such functions are not truly functors, because the universe type is not strictly a category (the field of homotopy type theory is dedicated to exploring how the universe type behaves more like a higher category). However, it is functorial up to propositional equalities, that is, the following identity types are inhabited:

$$\begin{align}
P(f\circ g) &= Pf\circ Pg \\
P(\mathsf{id}_X) &= \mathsf{id}_{PX}
\end{align}$$

for any functions f and g and any type X, where $\mathsf{id}_X$ is the identity function on the type X.
