= Double ended =

Double ended or double-ended may refer to:

- Double-ended ferry, see Ferry#Double-ended
- Double-ended queue
- Double-ended priority queue
- Double-ended tram
- Double-ended playing cards
- Double-ended pipefish
- Double ended stern
