= Dequeue =

In computer science, the word dequeue can be used as:

- A verb meaning "to remove from a queue"
- An abbreviation for double-ended queue (more commonly, deque)
