= Collection (abstract data type) =

Data type in computer science

Diagram of the class and interface hierarchy of the Java collections framework

In computer programming, a collection is an abstract data type that is a grouping of items that can be used in a polymorphic way.

Often, the items are of the same data type such as int or string. Sometimes the items derive from a common type; even deriving from the most general type of a programming language such as object or variant.

Although easily confused with implementations in programming languages, collection, as an abstract concept, refers to mathematical concepts which can be misunderstood when the focus is on an implementation. For example, a priority queue is often implemented as a heap, while an associative array is often implemented as a hash table, so these abstract types are often referred to by this preferred implementation, as a "heap" or a "hash", though this is incorrect conceptually.

== Subtypes ==
Other abstract data types are more specific than collection.

=== Linear ===
Some collections maintain a linear ordering of items – with access to one or both ends. The data structure implementing such a collection need not be linear. For example, a priority queue is often implemented as a heap, which is a kind of tree.

Notable linear collections include:

- list
- stack
- queue
- priority queue
- double-ended queue
- double-ended priority queue

=== Associative ===
Some collections are interpreted as a sort of function: given an input, the collection yields an output.

Notable associative collections include:

- set
- multiset
- associative array
- graph
- tree

A set can be interpreted as a specialized multiset, which in turn is a specialized associative array, in each case by limiting the possible values—considering a set as represented by its indicator function.

== Implementation ==
As an abstract data type, collection does not prescribe an implementation, though type theory describes implementation considerations.

Some collection types are provided as primitive data types in a language, such as lists, while more complex collection types are implemented as composite data types in libraries, sometimes in a language's standard library. Examples include:

- C++: also known as containers, implemented in C++ Standard Library and earlier Standard Template Library
- Java: implemented in the Java collections framework, many of which reside in namespace java.util
- Oracle PL/SQL implements collections as programmer-defined types
- Python: some built-in, others implemented in the collections library
- .NET provides the ICollection and IReadOnlyCollection interfaces and implementations such as List<T>.
- Rust provides various collections (such as the Vec<T> and HashMap<K, V> structs) in the std::collections namespace.
