= Wang Laboratories =

American computer company

Wang Laboratories, Inc.

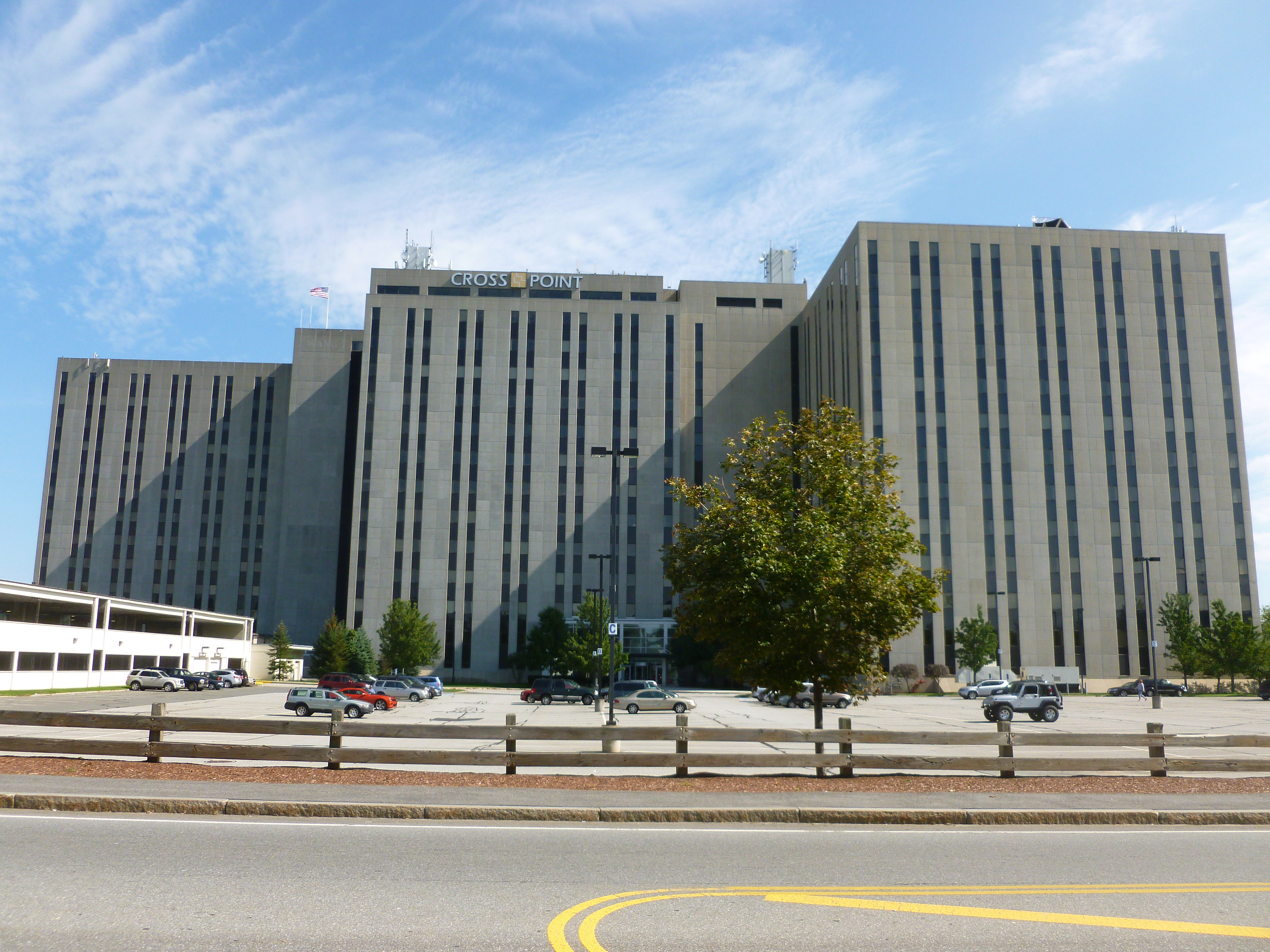
- Former Wang headquarters in Lowell, Massachusetts
- Type: Public
- Industry: Computer hardware
- Founded: Cambridge, Massachusetts, US (1951)
- Fate: Acquired by Getronics
- Headquarters: Tewksbury, Massachusetts, US (1963–1976); Lowell, Massachusetts, US (1976–1995); Billerica, Massachusetts (1995-1999)
- Key people: An Wang (founder)
- Products: Word processors, minicomputers, microcomputers
- Revenue: $3 billion (1980s, peak)
- Number of employees: 33,000 (1980s)

Wang Laboratories, Inc., was an American computer company founded in 1951 by An Wang and Ge Yao Chu and operating in the Boston area. Originally making typesetters, calculators, and word processors, it began adding computers, copiers, and laser printers. At its peak in the 1980s, Wang Laboratories had annual revenues of US$3 billion and employed over 33,000 people. It was one of the leading companies during the time of the Massachusetts Miracle.

The company was directed by An Wang, who was described as an "indispensable leader" and played a personal role in setting business and product strategy until his death in 1990. Over forty years, the company transitioned between different product lines, responding to competitive threats to its early products. The company was successively headquartered in Cambridge, Massachusetts (1954–1963), Tewksbury, Massachusetts (1963–1976), Lowell, Massachusetts (1976–1995), and finally Billerica, Massachusetts.

Wang Laboratories filed for bankruptcy protection in August 1992. After emerging from bankruptcy, the company changed its name to Wang Global. It was acquired by Getronics of the Netherlands in 1999, becoming Getronics North America, then was sold to KPN in 2007 and CompuCom in 2008.

== Public stock listing ==
Wang went public on August 26, 1967, with the issuance of 240,000 shares at $12.50 per share on the American Stock Exchange. The stock closed the day above $40, valuing the company's equity at approximately $77 million, of which An Wang and his family owned about 63%.

An Wang took steps to ensure that the Wang family would retain control of the company even after going public. He created a second class of stock, class B, with higher dividends but only one-tenth the voting power of class C. The public mostly bought class B shares; the Wang family retained most of the class C shares. The letters B and C were used to ensure that brokerages would fill any Wang stock orders with class B shares unless class C was specifically requested. Wang stock had been listed on the New York Stock Exchange, but this maneuver was not quite acceptable under NYSE's rules, and Wang was forced to delist with NYSE and relist on the more liberal American Stock Exchange. After Wang's 1992 bankruptcy, holders of class B and C common stock were treated the same.

== Products ==
=== Typesetters ===
The company's first major project was the Linasec in 1964, an electronic special-purpose computer designed to justify paper tape for use on automated Linotype machines. It was developed under contract to phototypesetter manufacturer Compugraphic, which retained the manufacturing rights of the Linasec. The success of the machine led Compugraphic to decide to manufacture it themselves, causing Wang to lose out on a million dollars in revenue.

=== Calculators ===
The Wang LOCI-2 (Logarithmic Computing Instrument) desktop calculator (the earlier LOCI-1 in September 1964 was not a real product) was introduced in January 1965. Using factor combining, it was the first desktop calculator capable of computing logarithms, which was notable for a machine without any integrated circuits. The electronics included 1,275 discrete transistors. It performed multiplication by adding logarithms, and roundoff in the display conversion was noticeable: 2 × 2 yielded 3.999999999.

From 1965 to about 1971, Wang was a well-regarded calculator company. The dollar price of Wang calculators was in the mid-four-figures. They used Nixie tube readouts, performed transcendental functions, had varying degrees of programmability, and used magnetic-core memory. The 200 and 300 calculator models were available as time-shared simultaneous (SE) packages that had a central processing unit the size of a small suitcase connected by cables leading to four individual desktop display/keyboard units. Competition included HP, which introduced the HP 9100A in 1968, and old-line calculator companies such as Monroe and Marchant.

Wang calculators were at first sold to scientists and engineers, but the company later became established in financial services industries, which had relied on complicated printed tables for mortgages and annuities.

In 1971, Wang believed that calculators would become unprofitable low-margin commodities and decided to leave the calculator business within a few years.

=== Word processors ===
==== The Wang 1200 ====
Wang's first attempt at a word processor was the Wang 1200, announced in late 1971 but not available until 1972. The design consisted of the logic of a Wang 500 calculator hooked up to an OEM-manufactured IBM Selectric typewriter for keying and printing, and dual cassette decks for storage. Harold Koplow, who had written the microcode for the Wang 700 and its derivative the Wang 500 rewrote the microcode to perform word processing functions instead of numerical calculations.

The operator of a Wang 1200 typed text on a conventional IBM Selectric keyboard; when the Return key was pressed, the line of text was stored on a cassette tape. One cassette held roughly 20 pages of text and could be "played back" (i.e., the text retrieved) by printing the contents on continuous-form paper in the 1200 typewriter's "print" mode. The stored text could also be edited using keys on a simple, six-key array. Basic editing functions included Insert, Delete, Skip (character, line), and so on.

The Wang 1200 machine was the precursor of the Wang Office Information System (OIS).

==== Wang OIS ====
Following the Wang 1200, Harold Koplow and David Moros made another attempt at designing a word processor. They started by first writing the user's manual for the product. A 2002 Boston Globe article refers to Koplow as a "wisecracking rebel" who "was waiting for dismissal when, in 1975, he developed the product that made computers popularly accessible."

In Koplow's words, "Dr. Wang kicked me out of marketing. I, along with Dave Moros, was relegated to Long Range Planning – 'LRPed'. This ... was tantamount to being fired: 'here is a temporary job until you find another one in some other company.'"

Although he and Moros perceived the assignment to design a word processing machine as busywork, they went ahead anyway. They wrote the manual and convinced An Wang to turn it into a real project. The word processing machine – the Wang 1200 WPS – was introduced in June 1976 and was an instant success, as was its successor, the 1977 Wang OIS (Office Information System).

The OIS was a multi-user system. Each workstation looked like a typical terminal but contained its own Intel 8080 microprocessor (later versions used a Z80) and 64 KB of RAM. Disk storage was centralized in a master unit and shared by the workstations, and the connection was via high-speed dual coaxial cable "928 Link".

=== Copiers/printers ===
Ahead of IBM and Xerox, Wang captured the lead for "the 'intelligent' printer: a high-speed office copier that can be linked electronically" to PCs "and other automated equipment". A year later, The New York Times described the IBM 6670 Information Distributor as "closer to the standard envisioned".

=== Early computer models ===
==== Wang 3300 ====
Wang's first computer, the Wang 3300, was an 8-bit integrated circuit general-purpose minicomputer designed to be the central processor for a multi-terminal time-sharing system. Byte-oriented, it also provided a number of double-byte operand memory commands. Core memory ranged from 4,096 to 65,536 bytes in 4,096-byte increments.

Development began after hiring Rick Bensene in June 1968. The product was announced in February 1969 and shipped to its first customer on March 29, 1971.

==== Wang 2200 ====
Wang developed and marketed several lines of small computer systems for both word processing and data processing. Instead of a clear, linear progression, the product lines overlapped and, in some cases, borrowed technology from each other.

The most identifiable Wang minicomputer performing recognizable data processing was the Wang 2200, which appeared in May 1973. Unlike some other desktop computers such as the HP 9830, it had a CRT in a cabinet that also included an integrated computer-controlled compact cassette storage unit and keyboard. It was microcoded to run interpreted Wang BASIC. It was widely used in small- and medium-sized businesses worldwide; about 65,000 systems were shipped.

The original 2200 was a single-user system. The improved VP model increased performance more than tenfold and enhanced the language (renamed BASIC-2). The 2200 VP evolved into a desktop computer and larger MVP system to support up to 16 workstations and utilized commercial disk technologies that appeared in the late 1970s and early 1980s. The disk subsystems could be attached to up to 15 computers giving a theoretical upper limit of 240 workstations in a single cluster.

Unlike the other product lines, such as the VS and OIS (described above), Wang used value-added resellers (VARs) to customize and market 2200 systems. One such creative solution deployed dozens of 2200 systems and was developed in conjunction with Hawaii- and Hong Kong–based firm Algorithms, Inc. It provided paging (beeper) services for much of the Hong Kong market in the early 1980s.

Overshadowed by the Wang VS, the 2200 languished as a cost-effective but forgotten solution in the hands of the customers who had it. In the late 1980s, Wang revisited the 2200 series one last time, offering 2200 customers a new 2200 CS with bundled maintenance for less than customers were paying at the time just for maintenance of their aging 2200s. The 2200 CS had an Intel 386 processor, updated disk units, and other peripherals. Most 2200 customers upgraded to the 2200 CS, after which Wang did not develop or market any new 2200 products. In 1997, Wang reported having about two hundred 2200 systems still under maintenance around the world. Throughout, Wang had always offered maintenance services for the 2200.

The 2200 BASIC-2 language was ported to be compiled and run on non-Wang hardware and operating systems by at least two companies. Niakwa Inc created a product named NPL (originally named Basic-2C). Kerridge Computer, now a part of ADP, created a product named KCML. Both products support MS-DOS, Windows, and various Unix systems. The BASIC-2 language was enhanced and extended by both companies to meet modern needs. Compared to the 2200 Wang hardware, the compiled solutions improved speed, disk space, memory, and user limits by tens to hundreds of times; although there is no Wang support for the 2200, many software applications continue to function.

During the 1970s, about 2,000 Wang 2200T computers were shipped to the USSR. Due to the Afghan war in the 1980s, US and COCOM export restrictions ended the shipment of Wang computers. The Soviets were in great need of computers. In 1981, Russian engineers at Minpribor's Schetmash factory in Kursk reverse engineered the Wang 2200T and created a computer they named the Iskra 226. The "COCOM restrictions" theory, though, while popular in the West, is challenged by some Russian computer historians on the basis that development for the Iskra-226 started in 1978, two years before the Afghan war. It is also different from the Wang 2200 in its internals, being more inspired by it rather than a direct clone.

It used the same BASIC language (named T-BASIC) with a few enhancements. Many research papers reference calculations done on the Iskra 226. The machine's designers were nominated for a 1985 State Prize. Later, a somewhat scaled-down Unix implementation was created for Iskra-226, which was used in the Soviet Union.

==== Alliance ====
Wang had a line called Alliance, which was based on the high-end OIS (140/145) hardware architecture. It had more powerful software than the OIS word processing and list processing packages. The system was Tempest certified, leading to global deployment in American embassies after the Iran hostage crisis. The Z80 platform on which Alliance ran forced it to remain as an 8-bit application in a 64 KB workstation.

== The Wang VS computer line ==
The first Wang VS computer was introduced in 1977, the same year as Digital Equipment Corporation's VAX; both continued for decades. The VS instruction set was compatible with the IBM System/360 series, but it did not run any System/360 system software.

=== Software ===
The VS operating system and all system software were built from the ground up to support interactive users as well as batch operations. The VS was aimed at the business data processing market in general and IBM in particular. While many programming languages were available, the VS was programmed in COBOL. Other languages supported in the VS integrated development environment included Assembler, COBOL 74, COBOL 85, BASIC, Ada, RPG II, C, PL/I, FORTRAN, Glossary, MABASIC, SPEED II, and Procedure (a scripting language). Pascal was also supported for I/O co-processor development. The Wang PACE (Professional Application Creation Environment) 4GL and database was used from the mid-1980s onward by customers and third-party developers to build complex applications, sometimes involving many thousands of screens, hundreds of distinct application modules, and serving many hundreds of users. Substantial vertical applications were developed for the Wang VS by third-party software houses throughout the 1980s in COBOL, PACE, BASIC, PL/I, and RPG II. The Wang OFFICE family of applications and Wang WP were both popular applications on the VS. Word Processing ran on the VS through services that emulated the OIS environment and downloaded the WP software as "microcode" (in Wang terminology) to VS workstations.

=== Hardware ===
The press and the industry referred to the class of machines made by Wang, including the VS, as "minicomputers," and Kenney's 1992 book refers to the VS line as "minicomputers" throughout. Although some argue that the high-end VS machines and their successors should qualify as mainframes, Wang avoided this term. In his autobiography, An Wang, rather than calling the VS 300 a mainframe, said that it "verges on mainframe performance." He went on to draw the distinction between the "mainframes" at the high end of IBM's line ("just as Detroit would rather sell large cars ... so IBM would rather sell mainframes")—in which IBM had a virtual monopoly—with the "mid-sized systems" in which IBM had not achieved dominance: "The minicomputer market is still healthy. This is good for the customer and good for minicomputer makers."

- The VS7000 was introduced in 1987. These were a renumbering of the VS100 and VS300, with their more powerful counterpart upgrades identified as VS7110, VS7120, and VS7130 (for the VS100) as the new high-end machine in this series.
- Later models, the small VS5000 series, launched in 1988, were user-installable, with the smallest being similarly sized to contemporary PCs.
- The largest iteration, the VS10000, supported many users. The VS10000 used "emitter coupled logic" (ECL). ECL is a very fast current-based logic that necessitates the use of 375 amp, 3-volt power supplies, massive heat-sinks, and large squirrel cage blowers. The VS1000 computer drew up to ten kilowatts of power. The VS1000 was designed to run multiple concurrent operating systems and was piloted with the VS ver7 and a Unix operating system.

== Going after IBM ==
An Wang felt a personal sense of rivalry with IBM, partly due to heavy-handed treatment by IBM in 1955 to 1956 over the rights to his magnetic-core patents (this encounter formed the subject of a long chapter in Wang's own book, Lessons). According to Charles C. Kenney, "Jack Connors remembers being in Wang's office one day when the Doctor pulled out a chart on which he had plotted Wang's growth and projected that Wang Laboratories would overtake IBM sometime in the middle of the 1990s. 'He had kept it a long time,' says Connors. 'And he believed it.'"

Wang was one of the first computer companies to advertise on television and the first to run an ad during the Super Bowl in 1978. Their first ad literally cast Wang Laboratories as David and IBM as Goliath, several years before the famous 1984 Apple Computer ad. A later ad depicted Wang Laboratories as a helicopter gunship taking aim at IBM.

Wang wanted to compete against IBM as a computer company, selling to management information system departments. The calculators, word processing systems, and OIS were sold into individual departments, bypassing the corporate data-processing decision-makers. The chapter in Wang's book dealing with them shows that he saw them as "a beachhead in the Fortune 1000." The Wang VS was Wang's entry into IT departments. In his book, An Wang notes that, to sell the VS, "we aggressively recruited salesmen with strong backgrounds in data processing ... who had experience dealing with MIS executives, and who knew their way around Fortune 1000 companies." As the VS took hold, the word processor and OIS lines were phased out. The word processing software continued, in the form of a loadable-microcode environment that allowed VS workstations to take on the behavior of traditional Wang WP terminals to operate with the VS and use it as a document server.

Wang made inroads into IBM and DEC markets in the 1980s, but did not have a serious impact on IBM's mainframe market due to self-limiting factors. Even though An Wang wanted to compete with IBM, too many Wang salespeople weren't trained enough on the DP capabilities of the VS. In many instances, the VS ran smaller enterprises up to about $500 million/year and, in larger organizations, found use as a gateway to larger corporate mainframes, handling workstation pass-through and massive print services.

At Exxon Corporation, for instance, thirteen 1985 top-of-the-line VS300s at the Houston headquarters were used in the 1980s and into the 1990s to receive mainframe reports and make them viewable online by executives.

At Mellon Mortgage, 18 VS systems from the smallest to the largest were used as the enterprise mortgage origination, servicing, finance, documentation, hedge system and mainframe gateway services (for login and printing). Between Mellon Mortgage and parent Mellon Bank, their network contained 45 VS systems and the Bank portion of the network supported about 16,000 Wang Office users for email, report distribution, and scheduling.

At Kent and KTec Electronics, two related Houston companies, separate VS clusters were the enterprise systems, handling distribution, manufacturing, and accounting, with significant EDI capability for receiving customer forecasts, sending invoices, sending purchase orders, and receiving shipping notifications. Both systems ran the GEISCO EDI package. Kent, which grew to $600 million/year, ran the Arcus distribution software in COBOL and KTec, which grew to $250 million/year, ran the CAELUS MRP system for manufacturing in BASIC.

=== Aggressive marketing ===
In the late 1980s, a British television documentary accused the company of targeting a competitor, Canadian company AES Wordplex, in an attempt to take it out of the market. However, the documentary came to no conclusion regarding this.

Wang's approach was called "The Gas Cooker Program," named after similar programs to give discounts on new gas stoves by trading in an old one. Wang was accused of targeting Wordplex by offering a large discount on Wang OIS systems with a trade-in of Wordplex machines, regardless of the age or condition of the trade-in machine.

Based on its good reputation with users and its program of aggressive discounts, Wang gained an increasing share of a shrinking market. Wordplex was taken over by Norsk Data.

=== Word processing market collapse ===
The market for standalone word processing systems collapsed with the introduction of the personal computer. MultiMate, on the IBM PC, and MS-DOS PC clones, replicated the keyboard and screen interface and functions of the Wang word processor, and was actively marketed to Wang corporate users, while several other WYSIWYG word processing programs also became popular.

Wang did make one last play in this arena, producing a dedicated Intel-based word processor called the Wang Office Assistant in 1984. This was marketed and sold successfully in the UK to a specific few office equipment dealers who were able to upgrade their clients from electronic typewriters to the Office Assistant. They proved to be very reliable and fast when connected to the Wang bi-directional printer, providing cheap but very fast word processing to small companies (such as solicitors). The USA was surprised at the success of this machine in the UK, but could not supply a spell-check programme in time before the PC. The PC, with its flexibility of combining word processors with other programs such as spreadsheets, had rendered such a specific-task machine unsellable. The Wang Office Assistant had a short life span of four years.

== The Digital Voice Exchange ==
The Wang DVX was one of the first integrated switchboard and voicemail systems. In the United Kingdom, it was selected for the DTI Office Automation pilot schemes at the National Coal Board in about 1980.

Wang, which had added DVX Message Waiting in 1984, named its 1989 announcement DVX II.

Internal research on speech recognition was carried out and implemented for discrete word recognition but was never released to the field. At one point there were 50 members of the Voice Engineering Department.

Lawrence E. Bergeron was instrumental in managing the Voice Engineering Department at Wang Labs. He promoted the purchase of a VAX-11/780 for 'real-time' signal processing research and created the Peripheral Signal Processor board (PSP). The PSP was placed into 16 racks to handle 128 phone lines for the DVX (Digital Voice Exchange). Wang's Digital Voice Exchange supported the renting of voice mailboxes. Voice prompts were created by a hired voice specialist to give a melodic presentation for the DVX. To avoid false triggering of touch-tones by the prompts (due to input/output cross talk), notch filters were created to remove the touch tone frequencies from the prompts. Prompt languages supported included German, Spanish, French, British English, American English, and Portuguese.

== PCs and PC-based products ==
Despite the release of the 2200 PCS (Personal Computer System) and 2200 PCS-II models in 1976, the history of computing regards the earliest PC as one which contained a microprocessor, which the 2200 PCS did not. However, the self-contained PCS-II incorporated many of the innovations that would later be seen in PCs, including the first 5.25-inch floppy drives that were designed for the PCS-II by Shugart Associates.

=== The original Wang PC ===
The original Wang PC was released in April 1982 to counter the IBM PC, which had been released the previous August and which had gained wide acceptance in the market for which Wang traditionally positioned the OIS system. It was based on the Intel 8086 microprocessor, a faster CPU than the IBM PC's 8088. A hardware/software package that permitted the Wang PC to act as a terminal to the OIS and VS products was available. The first version of the hardware component was made of two large add-in boards called the WLOC (Wang Local Office Connection). It contained a Z-80 processor and 64 KB of memory. The original PC-VS hardware used the 928 terminal emulator board; the WLOC boards were used in the subsequent 80286 machines.

These PCs later formed the basis for the system console on VS7000 and later series of the Wang mid-frame series, being used for the initialisation of the boot process. One of the distinguishing features of the Wang PC was the system software. Similar to the Wang VS minicomputer, the command line was not evident. Everything could be run from menus, including formatting a disk. Furthermore, each item on a menu could be explained by hitting a help key on the keyboard. This software was later sold in MS-DOS-compatible form for non-Wang hardware. The Wang word processing software was also very graphical. The keyboard had 16 function-keys and, unlike WordStar (the popular word processor of the day), control key combinations were not required to navigate the system. The F-keys had the word processing functions labeled on them.

Despite being a compliant MS-DOS system, it was not compatible with the IBM PC at the hardware level, because MS-DOS was used as a simple program loader. Complex software (spreadsheets, Flight Simulator, etc.) could obtain acceptable performance by direct manipulation of the hardware. Wang used a 16-bit data bus instead of the 8-bit data bus used by IBM, arguing that applications would run much faster since most operations required I/O (disk, screen, keyboard, printer). With this 16-bit design, Wang used peripheral hardware devices, such as the Wang PC display adapter, that were not compatible with their counterparts in the IBM PC line. This meant that the vast library of software available for the IBM PC could not be directly run on the Wang PC. Only those programs that were either written for the Wang PC or ported from the IBM PC were available. Lotus 1-2-3 and dBase II were also available. This lack of application software led to the original Wang PC's end, and it was replaced by an Intel 80286-based product that was plug compatible with the IBM PC. The unique system software was available at extra cost.

Most Wang PCs were released with a monochrome graphics adapter that supported a single video mode with text and graphics planes that could be scrolled independently. A color graphics adapter and Wang-branded color monitor were also available.

An ergonomic feature of the Wang PC was the monitor arm that clamped to the desk and held the monitor above and a system clamp that attached to the side of the desk and held the rather large computer box. By using these, there was nothing on the desktop except the keyboard.

=== IBM-compatible Wang PCs ===
Wang released an emulation board for Wang PC that enabled operation of many PC-compatible software packages. The board accomplished this by monitoring all I/O and memory transactions (visible in those days before North/South bridge chips to any board plugged into a slot on the expansion bus) and generating a non-maskable interrupt (NMI) whenever an operation was deemed to involve an incompatible device, requiring emulation.

For example, the floppy controller circuitry on the Wang PC was similar to that of the IBM PC but involved enough design differences that PC-compatible software attempting to manipulate it directly would fail. Wang's PC emulation hardware would detect I/O and memory operations involving the addresses associated with the floppy controller in the IBM PC and generate an NMI. The NMI handler would be activated (the exception vector having been appropriated during system init to point to ROM routines on the emulation board instead of the NMI routine in the PC BIOS) and would then update an internal representation of the IBM PC floppy controller and manipulate the real controller to reflect its state. Reads were satisfied in a similar way, by forcing an NMI, decoding the machine code indicated by the instruction pointer at the time of the fault, and then obtaining the desired info and updating the CPU registers accordingly before resuming the executing program.

IBM PC-emulation on the 8086-based Wang PC was working well when IBM released its 80286-based PC-AT, so Wang made the 80286-based Wang APC (Advanced Professional Computer).

Further iterations of the PC line were released commencing with the model number PC-240. They booted into MS-DOS or another compatible operating system, and supported ISA-standard expansion cards.

This PC-240 was still not IBM PC-standard, as the keyboard, although a standard PC/AT device, supported VS-compatibility with 24 function keys rather than the normal 12, and had a number of Wang VS-specific keys. There was also a slight difference in CPU interrupts from IBM standard, so some software had compatibility issues.

VS connectivity was via an ISA-based VS-terminal card, or via LightSpeed, the networked VS Terminal Emulator, over an IPX-based Ethernet connection. The PC-240 came with a Wang-specific Hercules Graphics Card and compatible screen, which also acted as a keyboard extension, so that the base unit could be kept some distance from the screen. This was later replaced with an EGA card and screen.

Around 1991, Wang released the PC350-16 and PC350-40, which were Intel 80386-based, clocked at 16 MHz and 40 MHz. They used the same VS-compatible keyboard as the PC-240, had a maximum of 4 megabytes of RAM, and came with VGA screens as standard. They were supplied by Microsoft with MS-DOS and Windows 3.0.

The 350-16 had a bug where the machine would freeze and not boot up if power-cycled at the mains. Although it would power on, the BIOS would not start. The solution was to turn on the machine at the mains and hold down the power button for 30 seconds, at which point it would start. It was suggested that this was due to an under-valued capacitor in the power circuit. This problem appeared to be resolved in the 350–40, which had a different PSU.

In 1992, Wang marketed a PC-compatible based on the Intel 80386SX processor, which it called the Alliance 750CD. It was clocked at 25 MHz and had a socket for an 80387 math coprocessor. It came with 2 megabytes of installed RAM, and was expandable to 16 megabytes using SIMM memory cards. It had a 1.44 megabyte floppy disk drive, an internal 80 megabyte hard disk, and a CD-ROM drive. Five expansion slots were built-in. It came with MS-DOS and Windows 3.1 operating systems.

In 1994, Wang released the slimline Alliance 750CD 80486 based PC in the United Kingdom. These machines used standard PC/AT keyboards and were IBM compatible, shipping with MSDOS 5.0 and Windows 3.11 as standard. System BIOS settings and the real-time clock were maintained by four standard AA batteries instead of a specialty battery pack or lithium battery. While offered with a 33 MHz 80486DX, the 750CD could be upgraded to later Socket 3 processors such as the 80486DX2 through the use of third party CPU upgrade adapters or interposers. This allowed upgrading to speeds beyond 50 MHz without overclocking, or more than 100 MHz with overclocking, dependent on the processor used.

=== Wang Freestyle ===
Wang Freestyle was a 1988 product consisting of:

- A touch-sensitive tablet and a special stylus for written annotation of any file that could be displayed on the PC.
- A phone handset for voice annotation, but not voice communication. Demonstrated with the tablet for explaining the text annotations.
- Email, via Wang OFFICE, of the resulting document set.

The pricing of the low-end product at $2,000 precluded the important features such as "facsimile and voice options" (priced at $12,000). Freestyle was not a success in anything except marketing terms. A description of the system at the University of Southern California (USC) shows the symptoms of the failure:

The $1.2 million USC system includes a VS 7150 mid-range computer; 30 image workstations, 25 with Freestyle capabilities; a laser printer; five endorsers; and five document scanners. Initial storage for document images is eight gigabytes of magnetic disk storage. 25 of the stations were Freestyle stations. The Freestyle was only affordable for highly specialized or very senior staff in Wang Laboratories. It was sold as a C-Level tool for C grades to communicate with other C Grades. This reduced the marketplace immediately from the mass market, where the system would have been effective.

== Decline and fall ==
Wang Labs was one of a large number of New England–based computer companies that faltered in the late 1980s and 1990s, marking the end of the Massachusetts Miracle. For instance, the struggling Digital Equipment Corporation also downsized in the 1990s and was acquired by Compaq.

A common view within the PC community is that Wang Labs failed because it specialized in computers designed specifically for word processing and did not foresee and could not compete with general-purpose personal computers with word-processing software in the 1980s. Word processing was not actually the mainstay of Wang's business by the time desktop computers began to gain in popularity. Although Wang manufactured desktops, its main business by the 1980s was its VS line of minicomputer and "midframe" systems. The market for these minicomputers was conquered by enhanced microcomputers like the Apple Macintosh and the Wintel PC and Sun, IBM, and Hewlett-Packard servers.

An Wang's insistence that his sons, Frederick and Courtney, would succeed him contributed to the company's failure. Fred Wang was a business school graduate, "but by almost any definition", wrote Charles C. Kenney, "unsuited for the job in which his father had placed him." His assignment, first as head of research and development, then as president of the company, led to resignations by key R&D and business personnel. Amid declining revenues, John F. Cunningham, an 18-year employee of the firm, resigned as president and COO of Wang Labs to become chairman and chief executive of Computer Consoles Inc. Cunningham resigned due to disagreement with An Wang on how to pull the company out of the slump, as well as being upset that Fred Wang was positioned, nepotistically, as An Wang's successor.

One turning point occurred when Fred Wang was head of R&D. On October 4, 1983, Wang Laboratories announced fourteen major hardware and software products and promised dates of delivery. The announcement was well received, but even at the time, there were warning signs. According to Datamation, Wang announced "everything but the kitchen sink. And if you could attach the kitchen sink to a personal computer, they would announce that too." Very few of the products were close to completion, and many of them had not even been started. All were delivered late, if at all. In retrospect, this was referred to as the "vaporware announcement," and it hurt the credibility of Fred Wang and Wang Laboratories.

In 1986, Fred Wang, then 36 years old, was installed as president and chief operating officer of Wang Laboratories. However, the company's fortunes continued to decline, although Charles Kenney "did not lay the failure at Fred's feet, but his father's, saying his father leaned too hard on family considering the sophistication of the company", as the market underwent great upheaval where minicomputers gave way to microcomputers. Unlike most computer companies that funded their growth by issuing stock, An Wang had used debt to avoid further dilution of family control of the company. By August 1989, that debt was causing conflicts with its creditors. On August 4, 1989, An Wang requested Fred's resignation, although Fred remained a member of the board of directors. Harry H.S. Chou, a vice chairman and director of the international computer maker, became acting president and served in that role until Richard W. Miller, who had been with the company since 1988, was named president of Wang Laboratories. Fred went on to attend the John F. Kennedy School of Government at Harvard, planning a new career in public service. While Courtney, An Wang's younger son, still remained with the company and had ambitions to eventually take over, he was only "a 33-year-old branch manager in the Dallas office and hardly a major player", plus Miller's contract "stipulated that he would never be subordinate to anyone at Wang Labs other than Dr. Wang.".

Miller announced in December 1989 that the company would start to embrace established software standards rather than use traditional proprietary designs. An Wang died in March 1990, and Miller took on the additional posts of chairman and CEO. The company underwent massive restructuring and layoffs and eliminated its bank debt in August 1990, but it still ended the year with a record net loss.

In November 1990, Wang announced their first personal computers running Unix. In 1987, Wang developed a new typesetting system in conjunction with Arlington, MA–based Texet Corp. The system used Xerox printers and UNIX workstations from Sun, but the product vanished before coming to market, because few Wang employees could use or support UNIX. UNIX ran on the VS – Interactive Systems first ported IN/ix (their IBM 360 version of SYS5 UNIX) to run in a VSOS Virtual machine circa 1985, and then Wang engineers completed the port so that it ran "native" on the VS hardware soon thereafter – but performance was always sub-par as UNIX was never a good fit for the batch-mode nature of the VS hardware, and the line-at-a-time processing approach taken by the VS workstations; indeed, the workstation code had to be rewritten to bundle up each keystroke into a frame to be sent back to the host when running UNIX so that "tty" style processing could be implemented. PACE, which offered its data dictionary, excellent referential integrity, and speedy application development, was in the process of being ported to UNIX under the name OPEN Pace. A client-server RDBMS model built on the original product's ideology, OPEN Pace was demonstrated at the North American PACE User Group Conferences in both Boston and Chicago. OPEN Pace, along with a new Windows-based word processor called UpWord (which was at the time considered a strong contender to retake Wang's original market leadership from Microsoft), were touted as their new direction. However, after a marketing study suggested that it would require large capital investments in order to be viable competitors against Microsoft, both products were abandoned.

Ira Magaziner, who was brought in by Miller in 1990, proposed to take Wang out of the manufacture of computers altogether, and to go big into imaging software instead. In March 1991, the company introduced its Office 2000 marketing strategy, focusing on office productivity.

In June 1991, Wang started reselling IBM computers, in exchange for IBM investing in Wang stock. Wang hardware strategy to re-sell IBM RS/6000s also included further pursuit of UNIX software.

In August 1991, Wang won a suit against NEC and Toshiba claiming violation of Wang's patents on single in-line memory modules (SIMMs). The company still recorded a net loss for the 1991 fiscal year.

Wang Laboratories filed for bankruptcy protection on August 18, 1992, at a time when the company's attempted concession from proprietary to open systems was deemed by some analysts as "too little and too late."

== Final years ==
Wang Global wordmark

Wang Labs emerged from bankruptcy on September 20, 1993. As part of its bankruptcy reorganization, the company's iconic headquarters, Wang Towers in Lowell, was sold at auction. The complex, which cost $60 million to build and housed 4,500 workers in over a million square feet (100,000 m^{2}) of office space, was sold in 1994 for $525,000. The renovated complex, which is now known as Cross Point, was sold in 1998 to a joint venture of Yale Properties and Blackstone Real Estate Advisors for a price reported to be over $100 million.

The company emerged from bankruptcy with $200 million in hand and embarked on a course of acquisition and self-reinvention, eschewing its former role as an innovative designer and manufacturer of computers and related systems. Later in the 1990s, and under the guidance of then CEO Joe Tucci, with the acquisition of the Olsy division of Olivetti, the company changed its name to Wang Global. By then, Wang had settled on "network services" as its chosen business.

The most advanced VS system, capable of supporting over 1,000 users – the VS18000 Model 950 – was released in 1999, and smaller models based on the same CPU chip were released in 2000 – the VS6760 and the VS6780. These were the last VS-based hardware systems.

Kodak acquired the Wang Software arm in 1997, strengthening its position in the then-booming document imaging and workflow market.

In 1999, Wang Global, by then back up to $3.5 billion in annual revenues, was acquired by Getronics of The Netherlands, a $1.5 billion network services company active only in parts of Europe and Australia. Joe Tucci departed Wang after the acquisition. Wang Labs then became Getronics North America.

In 2005, Getronics announced New VS (VSGX), a product designed to run the VS operating system and all VS software on Intel 80x86 and IBM POWER machines under Linux or Unix, using a hardware abstraction layer. The product was a joint commercial effort of Getronics and TransVirtual Systems, developers of the Wang VS virtualization technology that makes the New VS possible. VS software can be run under New VS without program or data conversion. The New VS combines configured mainstream PC or PowerPC server hardware running virtualization software. It is interoperable with SCSI-based Wang VS tape and disk drives, which provide a means of restoring VS files from standard backup tapes or copying VS disk drives. Wang networking and clustering are supported over TCP/IP.

In 2007, Getronics operations worldwide were divided and sold to companies in respective local geographies. Dutch telecommunications operator KPN acquired Getronics in North America and some parts of Europe. In July 2008, Getronics North America (now an arm of KPN) announced the ending of support for the legacy VS line as existing contracts expired, and that TransVirtual Systems would be exclusive reseller of the New VS platform. In August 2008, KPN sold Getronics North America to CompuCom of Dallas, Texas.

The Wang VS product line, not actively marketed since the 1993 bankruptcy and a tiny portion of the Getronics business, survived in use into the 21st century; by 2006, about 1,000 to 2,000 systems remained in service worldwide. In 2014, CompuCom announced that all support for legacy VS systems would cease at the end of 2014, while support for New VS systems would continue through TransVirtual Systems.

== See also ==
- Wang International Standard Code for Information Interchange
