= GE Capital IT Solutions =

- Type: Subsidiary of General Electric
- Industry: Information technology
- Defunct: 2004
- Fate: Acquired by Platinum Equity

GE Capital Information Technology Solutions or GE ITS was the information technology services subsidiary of the General Electric corporation. It was initially formed to provide information technology services to GE subsidiaries. However, it also solicited and provided services to other companies. Services offered ranged from desktop PC support and maintenance to 24x7 I.T. operations support. It has supported companies such as Cisco Systems, Inc, IBM Global Services, GE Financial Assurance (Now Genworth Financial), and Sybase, Inc.

GE ITS was acquired by Platinum Equity in late 2004 and has now been absorbed into the I.T. solutions company called CompuCom. This acquisition has resulted in a much larger customer base, so many of the personalized services previously provided by GE ITS have been lost or replaced by CompuCom's "one size fits all" business model.

GECITS also had a representation within Australia from the purchase of Ferntree Computer Corporation, a national computer company based in Melbourne. GECITS in Australia was eventually sold to Computer Sciences Corporation (CSC)
