= Queen Victoria Village =

Shopping centre in Melbourne, Australia

Coordinates: 37.8107°S 144.9652°E

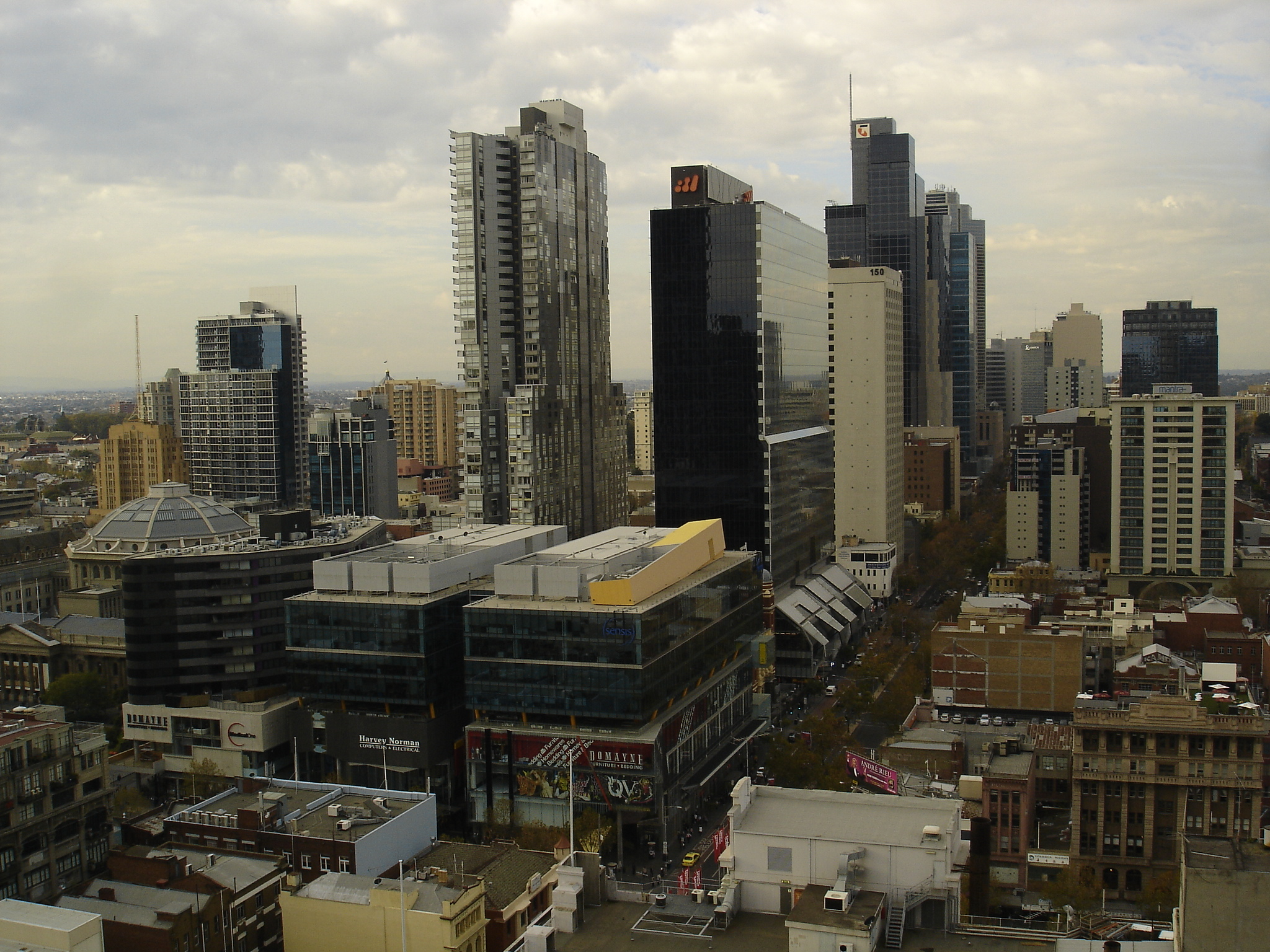
Queen Victoria Village in May 2008

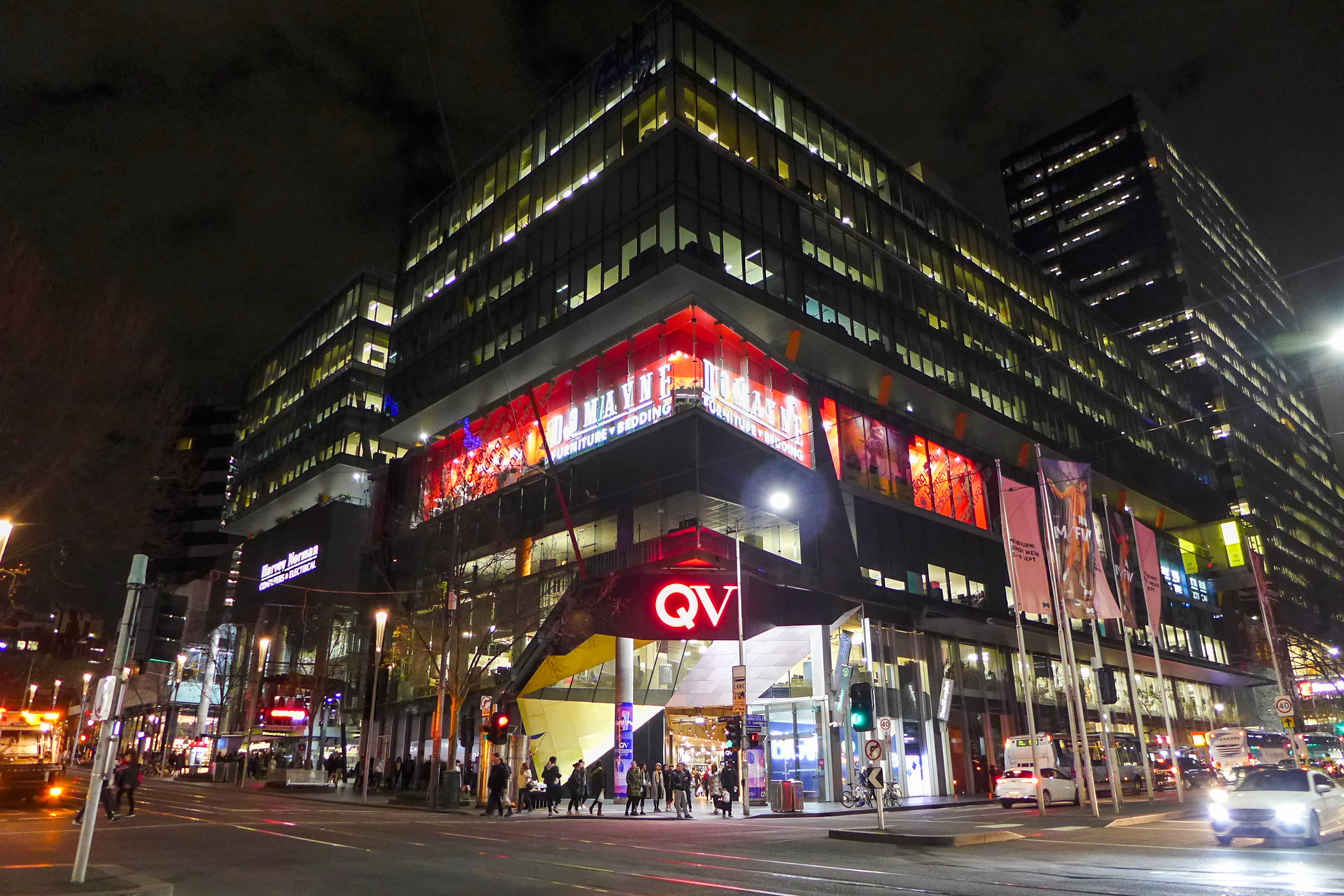
QV Melbourne Night view in August 2017

QV Melbourne or just QV, is a precinct in the Melbourne CBD, Victoria, Australia. Covering the city block bounded by Lonsdale, Little Lonsdale, Swanston, and Russell Streets, and located next to the State Library of Victoria, QV comprises a large shopping centre, a central plaza, an underground food court, Melbourne city's first full-size supermarket and apartment buildings.

QV takes its name from the Queen Victoria Hospital, Melbourne, which formerly occupied the site.

== History of the site ==
=== Queen Victoria Hospital, Melbourne ===
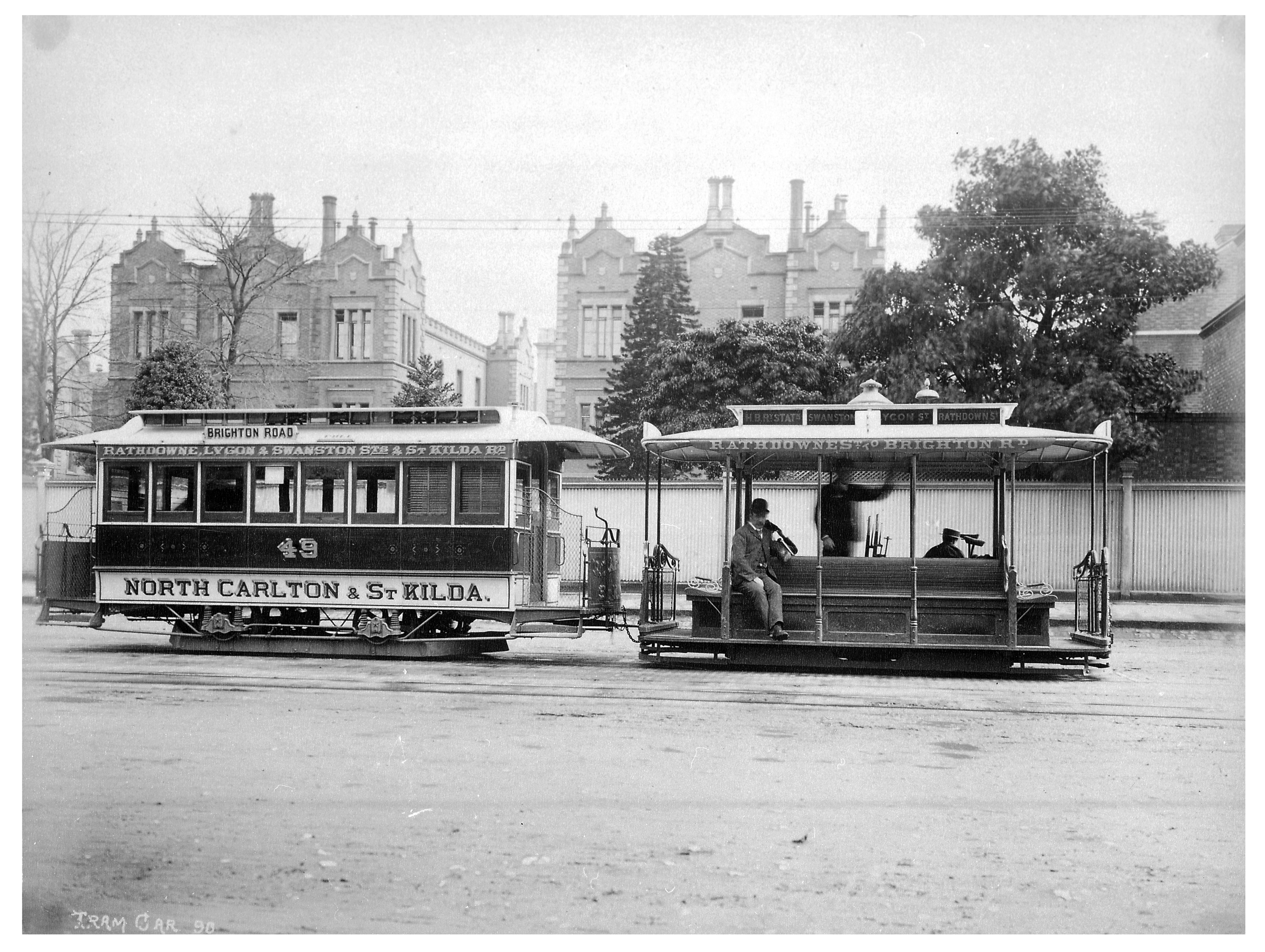
Cable tram dummy and trailer passing the QVH on route between Carlton and St Kilda in 1905.

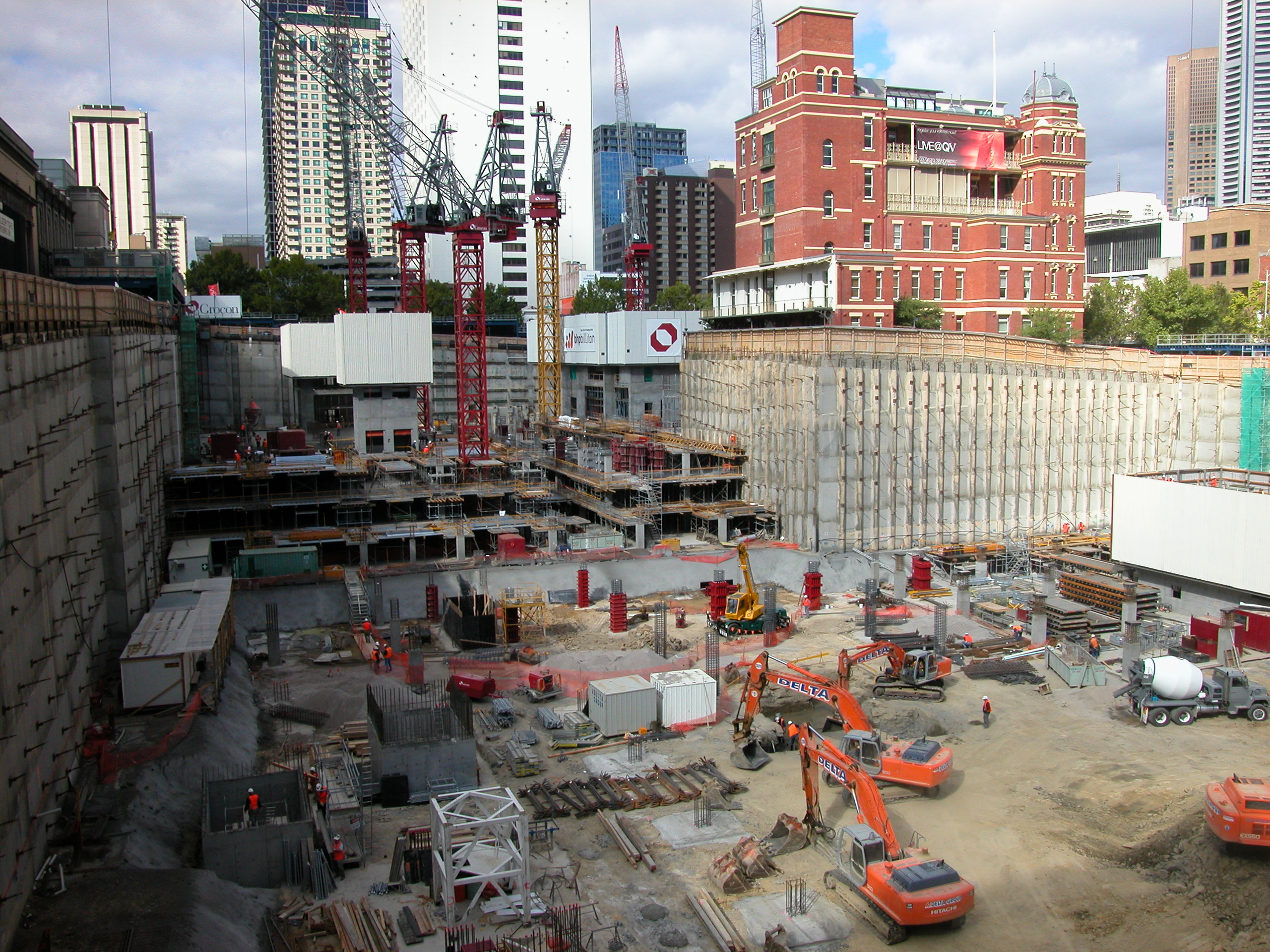
The construction site in March 2002

The site was originally the Melbourne Hospital, built in the 1840s—1860s as series of Tudor style buildings. The hospital was completely rebuilt on a much larger scale between 1910–1916 to a design by architect John James Clark in partnership with his son E.J. Clark. The hospital was composed of several five and six-storey Edwardian pavilions or towers, running north–south, housing the ward blocks, each with open verandahs for patients to convalesce in the open air. Tudor domed cupolas topped the front corners of each tower.

The hospital became the Royal Melbourne Hospital in 1935, and moves began to relocate to a former pig market site in Parkville. The new hospital was completed in 1941 but was occupied as a military hospital during the war. The move finally took place in 1944, and the old buildings were then occupied by the Queen Victoria Hospital, established 'by women for women' in 1896 and renamed the Queen Victoria Memorial Hospital in 1901 after the queen's death.

In 1986, with the pending relocation and amalgamation of the hospital, the site was to be redeveloped to house expansions of the State Library and Museum located on the block next door to the north, and a competition was held, with a condition being the preservation of the three towers. One such design by post-modern architects Edmond & Corrigan included a giant pyramid as the new book stacks on Swanston Street.

The hospital was closed in 1987, and the site was valued at A$63 million. During the financial squeeze of the early 1990s, it was eventually sold for only $15 million to property developer David Marriner in 1992. All but three of the hospital pavilions were demolished in the following years, with the final two that would have been preserved demolished in 1994 with a permit from then Planning Minister Rob Maclellan over-ruling the Historic Buildings Council.

=== Sailyards Skatepark ===
From 1996, the Swanston and Lonsdale Street corner of the site was home to the YMCA-managed Sailyards Skatepark. It was closed by Melbourne City Council in March 2001 and relocated to Boathouse Drive on the Yarra River in the city's Alexandra Gardens. During this time, it also hosted a series of failed ventures, including a craft market and a mini golf course before becoming a simple carpark.

=== Sale to Nauru ===
Marriner sold-on the site (except for the remaining tower) to the country of Nauru, which owned several other sites in the city, notably Nauru House, for $50.3 million.

=== Queen Victoria Women's Centre and QV Melbourne ===
As the site continued to remain relatively unused and abandoned in the centre of Melbourne's business district, it was called a "bloody disgrace" by then Premier Jeff Kennett.

After Nauru struggled to pay for the empty block, it was returned to the Melbourne City Council in 1999, which announced plans to develop the site. Grocon was awarded the tender to develop a $600 million "urban village" on the site, with the remaining building to become the Queen Victoria Women's Centre.

== The development ==
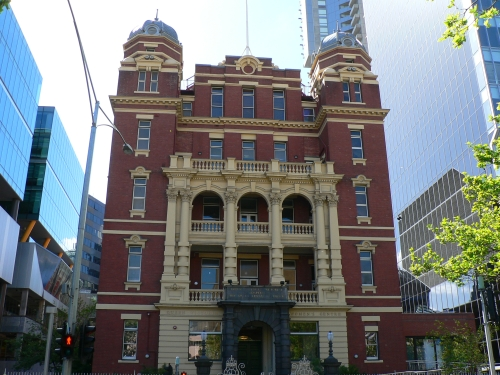
Main pavilion of the former Queen Vic Hospital, which is now the Queen Victoria Women's Centre, wedged between the glass corporate boxes of the Sensis and BHP headquarters; it is listed on the Victorian Heritage Register (H0956).

The 'urban village' of QV is a high-density, mixed use precinct containing retail, business, and living spaces. It was conceived by Roger Nelson FRAIA of NH Architecture in 1999 went on to coordinate the efforts of all the collaborators and design the podium and ground levels as well as working in Joint venture with John Wardle and McBride Charles Ryan for QV1 and QV2 respectively. Denton Corker Marshall designed the Sensis building and, Lyons the BHP building. KTA (Kerstin Thompson Architects) designed the infill building on Russel Street that includes the Child Care facility on the roof.

The site is split into four main structures, named QV1 through QV4, two of which are skyscrapers, the remainder being low-rise structures along Swanston Street (owing to strict height limits along the Swanston Street axis). The spaces between buildings were specifically designed as shop-filled laneways, pointing to Melbourne's historic lanes and arcades, many of which no longer exist due to the amalgamation of plots to build office buildings. These new laneways are named for figures in medicine: Jane Bell Lane, Albert Coates Lane, Artemis Lane, and Red Cape Lane. At the centre of the site is an open-air public square, behind the historic Women's Centre.

QV began to open progressively from late 2003, and is now complete.

=== Queen Victoria Women's Centre ===
A trust was established under the Queen Victoria Women's Centre Act 1994 (No. 103 of 1994) to govern the centre, which acts as a statutory authority consistent with the meaning of 'public body' in section 3 of the Financial Management Act 1994. The Queen Victoria Women's Centre was officially opened in 1997 and refurbished in 2005. The Queen Victoria Women's Centre offers four venue spaces in the beautiful setting in the heritage building. The venues hold celebratory events, seminars, workshops, exhibitions, board meetings and smaller gatherings. The building is also home to a range of not for profit women’s organisations that offer a range of support and information services to women. Each organisation is independently run.

=== Offices ===
The skyscraper located at 180 Lonsdale houses offices.

More offices are housed in the 222 Lonsdale Street building at the corner of Lonsdale and Swanston Streets, and the building immediately north of this. These two buildings are linked by two bridges spanning Albert Coates Lane.

=== Retail shops ===
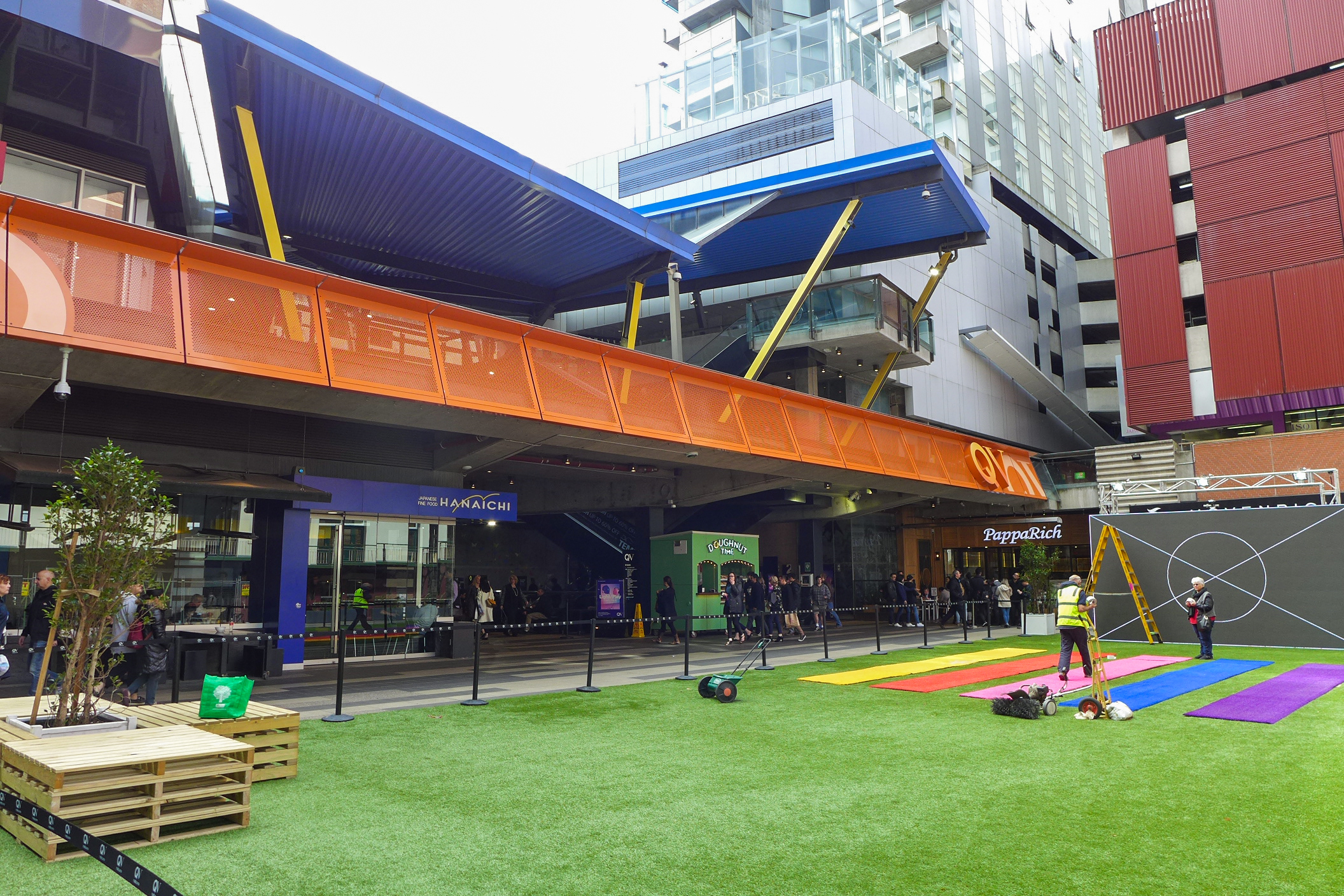
QV Square

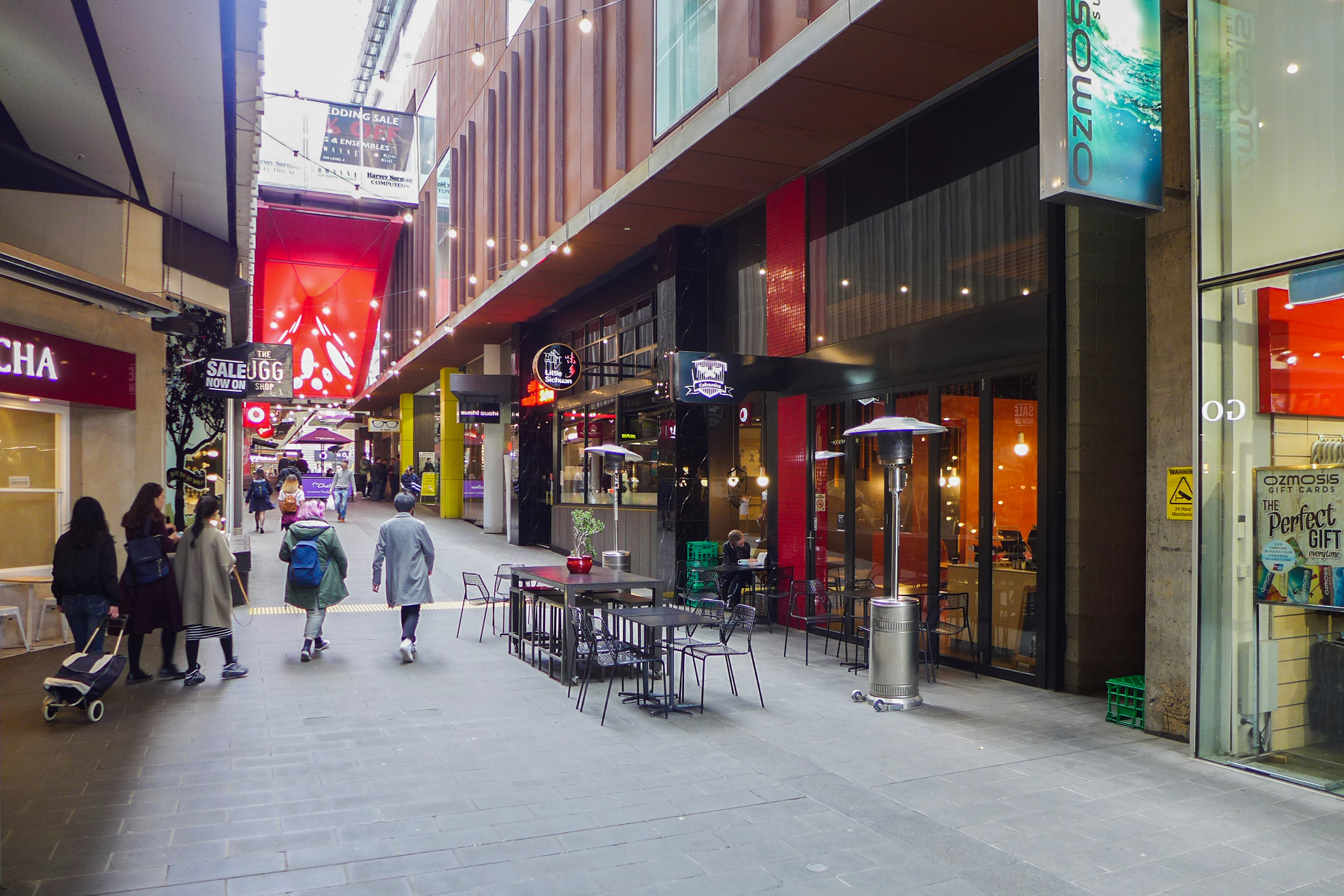
Red Cape Lane shops

There is a very diverse mix of retailers at QV. Some of the major retailers at QV include:

- Woolworths - 11 aisle full line supermarket
- Big W - discount department store
- Harvey Norman/Domayne - furniture and electronics retailer
- Officeworks - office products
- Dan Murphy's - liquor store
- Fitness First - gym

As well as retail outlets, there are many options for entertainment at QV. There are also many restaurants at the precinct, as well as bars and a bowling venue.

=== Apartments ===
Apartments are located in two buildings at QV, both of which are located along Little Lonsdale Street. One of the apartment buildings is the slender skyscraper located at the Russell Street corner, whilst the other is a lower-rise structure on the Swanston Street corner. The latter is low-rise to meet height restrictions on Swanston Street, intended to allow greater viewability of the dome of the State Library of Victoria.
