= Harold Koplow =

American businessman (1940–2004)

- Born: November 21, 1940; Boston, Massachusetts, U.S.
- Died: November 4, 2004 (aged 63); Gainesville, Florida, U.S.
- Occupation: Computer scientist

Harold Stanley Koplow (November 21, 1940 – November 4, 2004) was an American computer scientist and one of the early developers of office automation equipment.

== Early life and education ==
Koplow was born in Boston and raised in Lynn, Massachusetts, The son of Leo Koplow and Getrude Doctorman Koplow. When his father developed health problems, Koplow became a pharmacy technician at his father's store, Broadway Pharmacy. After graduating from Swampscott High School, he was accepted at both MIT and the Massachusetts College of Pharmacy and Health Sciences, and opted for the latter because he hadn't received a scholarship at MIT. He then enrolled at Tufts University for a graduate degree in Physics.

== Career ==
Koplow briefly worked as a school teacher before joining Wang Laboratories, where he programmed calculators. In 1968, he developed a program for calculating dosages of a cancer treatment, known was the Koplow Equation. One of his programs permitted a Wang calculator to interface with an IBM Selectric typewriter, which could be used to calculate and print the paperwork for auto sales. He was R&D product development manager in 1973, when he was appointed to the executive board of the Society for Wang Applications and Programs (SWAP).

Koplow's interface program was developed, in 1974, into the Wang 1200 Word Processor, an IBM Selectric-based text-storage device. The operator of this machine typed text on a conventional IBM typewriter; when the Return key was pressed, the line of text was stored on a cassette tape. One cassette held roughly 20 pages of text, and could be "played back" (i.e., the text retrieved) by printing the contents on continuous-form paper in the 1200 typewriter's "print" mode. The stored text could also be edited, using keys on a simple, six-key array. Basic editing functions included Insert, Delete, Skip (character, line), and so on.

The labor and cost savings of this device were immediate, and remarkable: pages of text no longer had to be retyped to correct simple errors, and projects could be worked on, stored, and then retrieved for use later on. The rudimentary Wang 1200 machine was the precursor of the Wang Office Information System (OIS), which revolutionized the way typing projects were performed in the American workplace.

When Wang acquired Philip Hankins, Inc. (PHI), Koplow met Dave Moros, with whom he would later collaborate to create the Wang Word Processing System. This and other office automation products that were created in Koplow's department were among the most successful products in Wang's history. Koplow resigned from Wang in 1982 because of conflicts with Fred Wang.

== Personal life ==
Koplow married Eleanor Lee Rosenthal in 1962 after graduating from pharmacy school, and had two children by 1968. After leaving Wang, he lived briefly in California before moving to Gainesville, Florida, where he died in 2004.
