= Albert Coates (surgeon) =

Australian surgeon

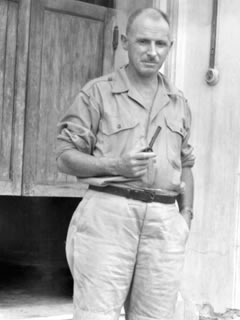
Lieutenant Colonel Albert Coates at the Recovered Allied Prisoner-of-War and Internees Unit in 1945

Sir Albert Ernest Coates OBE, FRCS (1895–1977) was an Australian surgeon and soldier. He served as a medical orderly in World War I serving on Gallipoli, and as a senior surgeon for the Australian Army Medical Corps in World War II in Malaya. He was captured by the Japanese and during his time as a POW, worked as a surgeon for the many Allied POWs working to build the Burma-Thailand Railway.

== Early life ==
Coates was born in Mount Pleasant, a suburb of Ballarat, Victoria in 1895 in Australia. Aged 11 years, he left school and went to work as a butcher and an apprentice bookbinder. His primary school teacher, Mr Leslie Morshead, later Lt-Gen Sir Leslie Morshead, CO 9th Div AIF, offered to teach Albert at night school. He studied languages and sciences, and at 18 years sat the matriculation equivalent, receiving 5 distinctions. He left his apprenticeship and obtained work at the Melbourne and subsequently Wangaratta PO while he studied pre-med subjects to facilitate his enrollment in the University of Melbourne medical school.

== First World War service ==
In 1914 Coates enlisted in the 7th Battalion as a medical orderly and the following year served on Gallipoli. Coates was one of the last to leave the peninsula on the night of 19/20 December 1915. His battalion was then transferred to France in March 1916 and fought in the battle of the Somme. His skill as a linguist came to the attention of his superiors and in February 1917 he was attached to the intelligence staff, I Anzac Corps. Sir John Monash and British authorities recognised his ability and, at the end of the war, he was invited to apply for a commission in the British Army. Coates preferred, however, to go home to Australia where he found employment in the office of the Commonwealth censor in Melbourne.

== Between The Wars ==
After the war and on his return to Australia Coates worked nights as a postal worker to support himself through medical school. In 1925 Coates became a resident at (Royal) Melbourne Hospital. He worked with Professor Richard Berry in the university's department of anatomy, first as a Stewart lecturer (1925–26) and next as acting-professor (1927). Back at (Royal) Melbourne Hospital, he was appointed honorary surgeon to out-patients in 1927 and to in-patients in 1935. Following his first wife's death he visited surgical centres in Britain, Europe and North America; shortly after his return he was asked to establish the neurosurgical unit at the R.M.H. From 1936 to 1940 he was part-time lecturer in surgical anatomy at the University of Melbourne. Coates remained active in the military and by the outbreak of war was a captain in the Australian Army Medical Corps.

== Second World War and capture in Sumatra ==
Appointed lieutenant colonel, Australian Army Medical Corps, on 1 January 1941, Coates joined the Australian Imperial Force next day aged 46. He was posted to the 2nd/10th Australian General Hospital and stationed at Malacca, Malaya. After the Japanese invaded on 8 December, the 2nd/10th A.G.H. fell back to Singapore; Coates was ordered to join a party which sailed on 13 February 1942 for Java, Netherlands East Indies. The convoy was bombed and the survivors reached Tembilahan, Sumatra, where Coates saved many lives with his surgical skill. He made himself responsible for treating all British casualties, and felt duty-bound to stay with them, though he could have left on several occasions. On 28 February he arrived at Padang which was occupied by the Japanese three weeks later and Coates became a prisoner of war.

== POW Burma-Thailand Railway ==
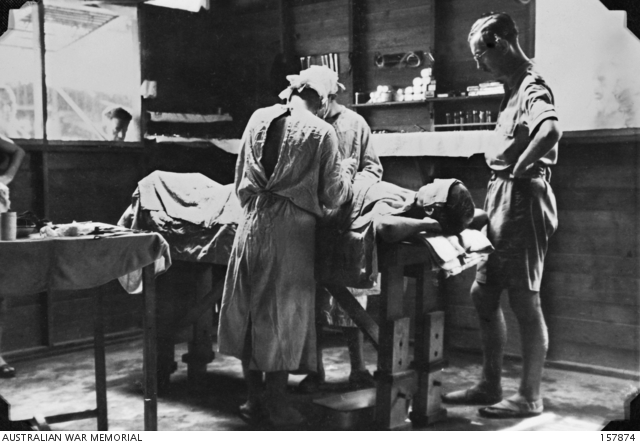
The operating theatre at the prisoner-of-war hospital, Nakom Paton, Thailand, where Coates was Chief Medical Officer.

In May 1942 the Japanese moved Coates to Burma. At the Kilo-30 and Kilo-55 camps on the Burma-Thailand Railway he cared for hundreds of prisoners of war under deplorable conditions. Coates subsequently described his medical practice at Kilo-55 to the International Military Tribunal for the Far East: in a bamboo lean-to, with his only instruments a knife, two pairs of artery forceps and a saw (used by the camp butchers and carpenters), his daily work consisted of 'segregating the sick from the very sick . . . curetting seventy or eighty ulcers during the morning . . . and, in the afternoon, proceeding to amputate nine or ten legs'.

In December 1943 the Japanese sent Coates to Thailand. There, from March 1944, he was chief medical officer of a prisoner-of-war hospital (10,000 beds) at Nakhon Pathom (Nakhon Pathom). Through 'his initiative, resource and enthusiasm he was responsible for many improvisations which provided artificial limbs, transfusions and surgical appliances'. (Sir) Edward Dunlop recalled that Coates's 'short, upright figure with a ghost of a swagger, a Burma cheroot clamped in his mouth, and his staccato flow of kindly, earthly wisdom became the object of hero-worship and inspiration'. With the cessation of hostilities, Coates returned to Melbourne in October 1945, transferred to the Reserve of Officers on 6 December and was appointed O.B.E. in 1946. Coates was a key witness at the Tokyo War Crimes Tribunal in '46, was appointed an OBE in '47, was an RSL delegate at the signing of the Peace Treaty in the US in '51, and was knighted by the Queen in '55.

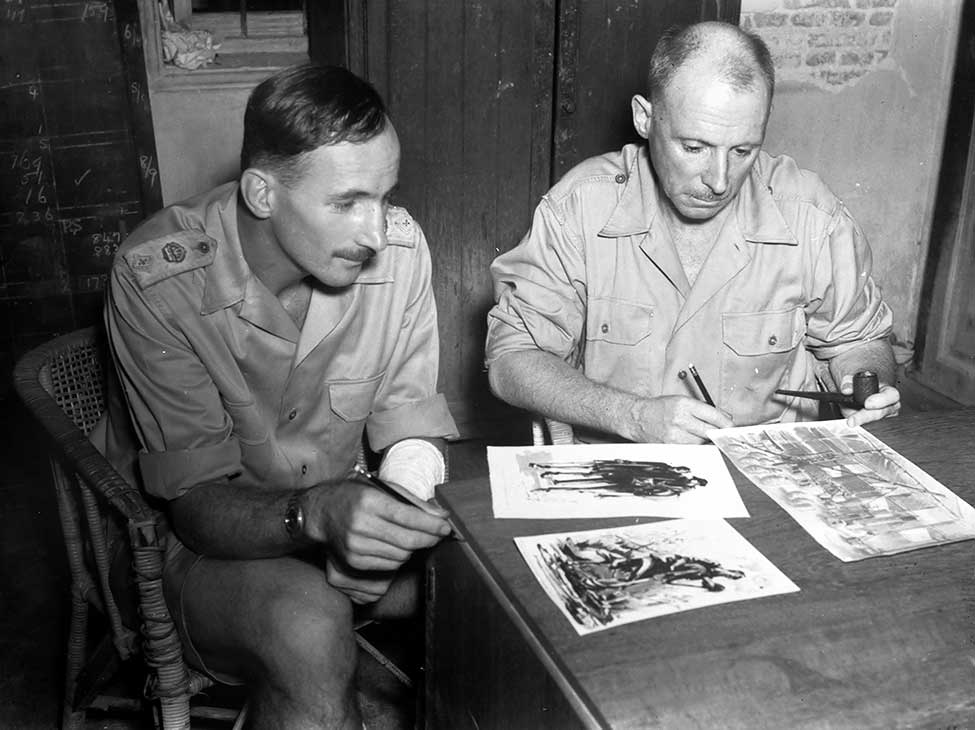
Lieutenant-Colonel E.E. ‘Weary’ Dunlop and Lieutenant-Colonel Albert Coates at Nakhon Pathom hospital camp, Thailand. Both are looking at sketches made by British artist Jack Bridger Chalker. While Dunlop was the senior officer at Nakhon Pathom, he deferred to Coates’ extensive medical knowledge. Coates had served during World War I and was also well-known and respected among prisoners of war.

== Career ==
In between the wars, Coates studied surgery and helped to establish the Neurosurgical Society of Australia. He returned to surgical work following World War Two later became Senior Surgeon at the Royal Melbourne Hospital and Stewart Lecturer in Surgery at the University of Melbourne. He was made a Fellow of the Royal College of Surgeons (FRCS).

Albert Coates died in Melbourne in 1977, survived by his wife, two sons (both doctors) and three daughters (two nurses and a teacher). A eulogy was given at his funeral by (Sir) Edward Dunlop.

== Awards and recognition ==
Coates was made an Officer of the Order of the British Empire (Military) in 1946 for "distinguished service in the field". He was knighted in 1955 and in 1981 was made a Member of the Order of the British Empire (Civil) for his "services to the handicapped and veterans".

A statue in honour of Sir Albert Ernest Coates is located in the main street of his home town of Ballarat. A laneway in the Queen Victoria Village is named Albert Coates Lane in his honour.

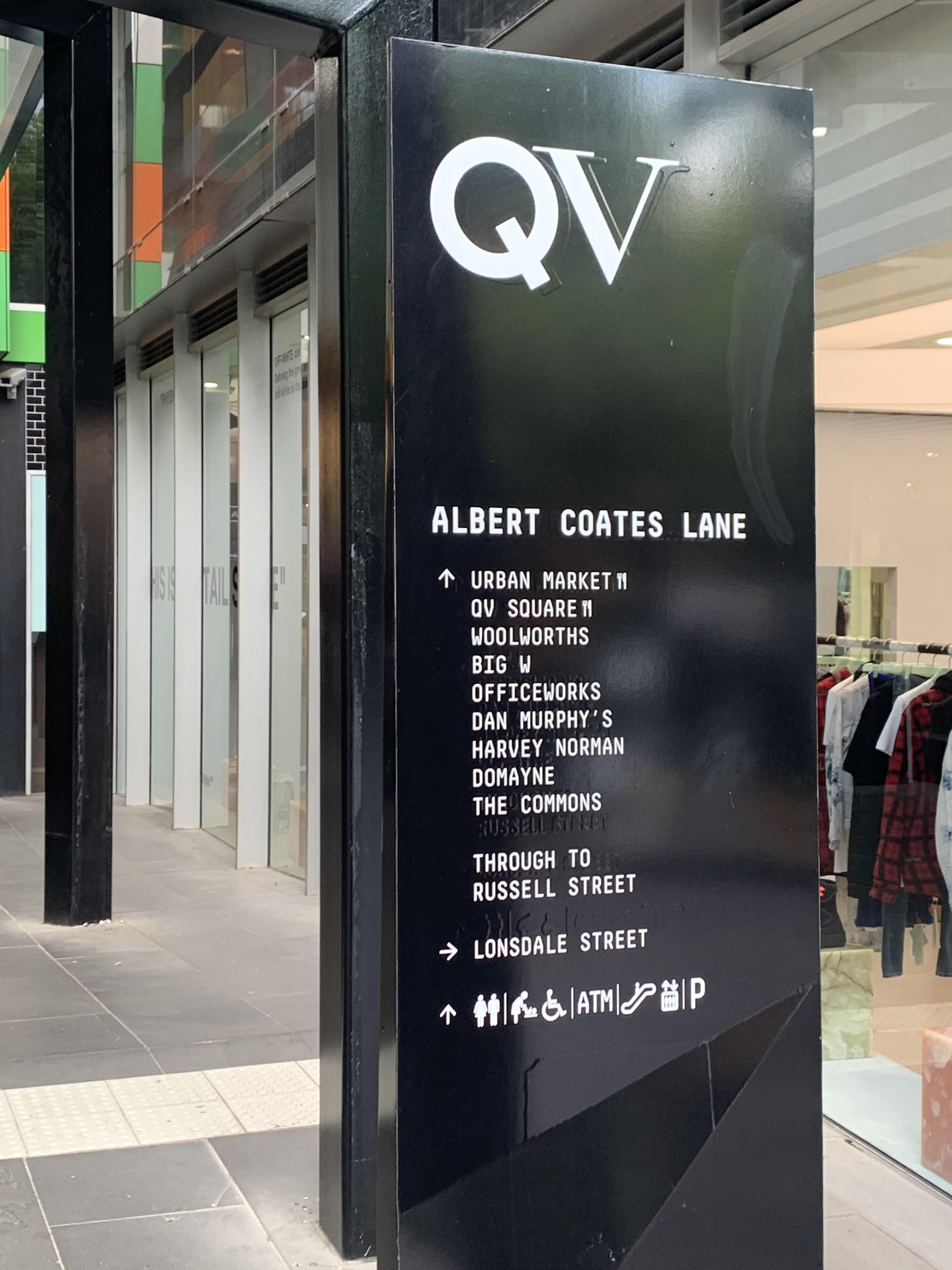
Albert Coates Lane, Melbourne

On 8 September 2006, the University of Ballarat renamed its student union building the Albert Coates Complex.

The Sir Albert Coates Oration is an annual event at the University of Ballarat.

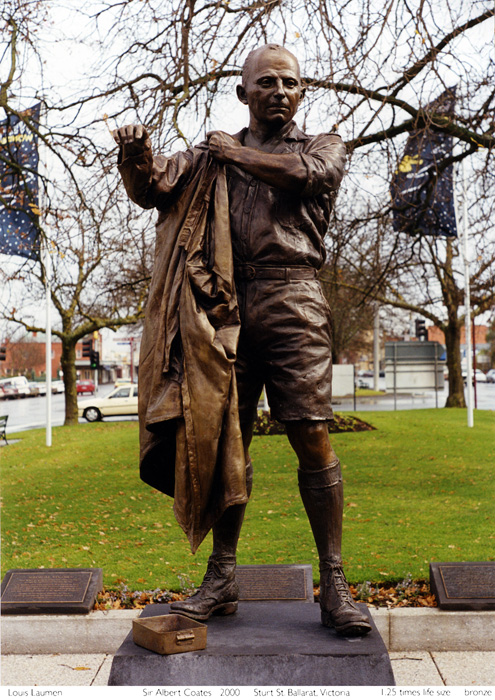
Sir Albert Coates statue in Ballarat, Victoria.
