= CompuCom Systems =

US technology services provider

CompuCom Systems Inc.
- Industry: Information Technology Services
- Predecessor: Safeguard Scientifics Tri-Star Data Systems Office Automation
- Founded: 1987
- Headquarters: Fort Mill, South Carolina
- Area served: North America
- Key people: Jvalin Patel, President
- Services: End-to-end managed services, technology, and consulting to enable the digital workplace for enterprise, midsize and small businesses.
- Owner: Variant Equity Advisors
- Number of employees: 8,000
- Parent: The ODP Corporation (2017–2021)
- Website: https://www.compucom.com

CompuCom Systems Inc. is a technology managed services provider and product reseller headquartered in Fort Mill, South Carolina. It is a wholly owned subsidiary of Variant Equity Advisors. In business since 1987, CompuCom provides Managed Workplace Services including IT solutions and hardware, integration and support services and has partnerships within the technology space such as HP, IBM, Cisco, Dell, Apple, Inc, Jamf Pro, AirWatch.

== Corporate history ==
CompuCom was formed in 1987 by Safeguard Scientifics, a venture capital company. It was started when predecessor Machine Vision International acquired two computer-focused technology companies, Tri-Star Data Systems and Office Automation, under the umbrella of Safeguard Scientifics, which named the merged company CompuCom.

Under the majority ownership of Safeguard Scientifics, CompuCom became a public company in 1987. Also that year, it acquired the CompuShop retail store chain from Bell Atlantic, and moved into its Dallas headquarters. James W. Dixon, president of CompuShop was appointed CEO of CompuCom and served from 1987 to 1996 and became chairman of the board on leaving

Safeguard Scientifics held majority ownership of CompuCom until 2004, building it into a company with $1.5 billion in annual revenues.

In December 2000, CompuCom purchased the assets of MicroAge Technology Services, one of the largest divisions of bankrupt parent company MicroAge. This included all of MicroAge's remaining service network of locations.

In 2004, Safeguard sold CompuCom to Platinum Equity, a private equity investment firm for $128 million, and appointed Dixon as CEO. CompuCom acquired GE Capital Information Technology Solutions (GE ITS), to expand its services portfolio. CompuCom then became partners and resellers of Jamf Pro, VMware.

In 2007, Platinum Equity sold CompuCom to Court Square Capital Partners, a private equity firm.

In 2008, CompuCom acquired the U.S. division of Getronics and in 2009, joined with Getronics and other IT services providers to form the Getronics Workspace Alliance.

In 2013, CompuCom was sold to Thomas H. Lee Partners, also a private equity firm.

In 2015, Dixon retired as CEO, and was replaced by Dan Stone in 2016.

In 2016, the company moved its headquarters from Dallas to Plano, Texas.

In 2017, CompuCom was sold to Office Depot and moved its headquarters to Indian Land, South Carolina.

in 2021, CompuCom was sold to Variant Equity Advisors LLC for $305 million, with Kevin Shank named as president in December 2022.
