= Sensis (company) =

Sensis Pty Ltd
- Type: Private
- Industry: Marketing and Advertising
- Key people: John Allan (CEO)
- Parent: Platinum Equity (70%); Thryv (30%)
- Website: sensis.com.au

Thryv (formerly Sensis) is an Australian platforms and marketing services company that owns the Yellow Pages and White Pages, as well as a variety of other websites and publications in Australia. Prior to the sale of 70% of the Sensis business to American private equity firm Platinum Equity in March 2014, Sensis was Telstra's wholly owned advertising and directories arm. Telstra sold its remaining 30% stake to US Software company Thryv in March 2021 for $250 million.

== History ==
Thryv, prior to being called Sensis, was originally known as National Directory Services (NDS), but subsequently renamed Pacific Access in 1991, before changing its name to Sensis in August 2002. Sensis publishes Australia's White Pages and Yellow Pages telephone directories, and in 2004 purchased the Trading Post, a classified advertising periodical. In 2008 management of the Trading Post was transferred to Telstra. In 2009 the printed Trading Post was shut down.

Sensis is responsible for Telstra's telephone directory assistance call centers – including 1223 ("Telstra Directory Assistance"), 12456 ("Call Connect"), 1225 ("International Directories") and 1234 ("1234" information service).

In 2007, Sensis commissioned Amdocs to develop a customer interaction and database management system dubbed "iGen" to combine the company's dozens of other internal customer and account systems into one interface. The new system would combine both Yellow Pages and White Pages directory information on one system. The original cost of development and implementation was estimated at A$300 million, but a twelve-month delay almost doubled the original cost. "iGen" was eventually deployed to mass disapproval from employees.

In November 2009, the entire White Pages directory product reverted to the legacy system, GENESIS. In 2010, Sensis CEO Bruce Akhurst announced that the Yellow Pages had been switched over to iGen. In a blog posting he stated that they were ahead of the biggest system challenges and that iGen was "stable" and "operating effectively". Sensis announced job cuts in February 2013 of around 700 roles nationally, and outsourced some roles to India. In 2019, Yellow Pages (now renamed Yellow) won the 2019 Microsoft Advertising APAC Channel Partner of the Year award.
