= Global Workspace Alliance =

Alliance of IT service providers

- Company type: Alliance
- Industry: Information Technology & Communication
- Founded: 2009
- Headquarters: Amsterdam, the Netherlands
- Number of locations: Argentina, Belgium, Brazil, Canada, China, Colombia, France, Germany, Hong Kong, Hungary, India, Ireland, Japan, Luxembourg, Malaysia, Mexico, Netherlands, Portugal, Puerto Rico, Saudi Arabia, Singapore, South Korea, Spain, Switzerland, United Arab Emirates, United Kingdom, United States
- Products: Workspace ICT Services
- Number of employees: 40,000 (July 2016)
- Website: www.workspacealliance.com

The Global Workspace Alliance (GWA), headquartered in Amsterdam, the Netherlands, is the world´s first alliance of IT service providers. Formerly known as the Getronics Workspace Alliance, it was founded in 2009 by Getronics and 6 other service partners. In 2015, the GWA went through a transformation, and was re-launched with Getronics and CompuCom in the lead as the Global Workspace Alliance. Other partners include Tecnocom, SPIE ICS, S&T, Centric, Infocare, NSC, AGCN, Eire Systems and TopNew Info.

== History ==
On March 25, 2009, representatives of the 7 founding IT service providers – KPN Getronics, CompuCom, Getronics Middle East, NTT Data Getronics, ServiceOne Getronics and Tecnocom- met in The Netherlands to announce the founding of the Alliance (formerly known as Getronics Workspace Alliance). Upon formation, the Getronics Workspace Alliance served 6.1 million client IT assets worldwide.

In 2010, the GWA was recognized as a visionary by Gartner Inc. in the Magic Quadrant for Desktop Outsourcing Europe; and in 2011, as a Strong Performer by Forrester Research, Inc. in the Forrester WaveTM on Global IT infrastructure Outsourcing.

As of September 2011, the Getronics Workspace Alliance is still composed by the same founding members, with direct offices in 30 countries and a total workforce of 32,000. In addition, they partner with non-member service partners for broader coverage.

In September 2015, Getronics and CompuCom launch together Global Workspace Alliance 2.0, expanding the Alliance coverage to over 40 countries with new partners in the Netherlands (Centric), the Nordics (Infocare), Japan (EIRE Systems), Italy (NSC) and Eastern Europe (S&T).

In July 2016, TopNew Info, a China-based company joins the GWA to provide on-site support in China and Hong Kong. In December 2017, the Global Workspace Alliance was named 'Most Revolutionary Ecosystem' by Outsource Magazine.

== See also ==
- Blender Foundation
