= Platinum Equity =

American private equity investment firm

Platinum Equity, LLC
- Type: Private
- Industry: Private equity
- Founded: 1995; 31 years ago
- Founder: Tom Gores (chairman & CEO)
- Headquarters: Beverly Hills, California, United States
- Products: Investments, private equity funds, leveraged buyouts
- Website: platinumequity.com

Platinum Equity, LLC is an American private equity investment firm founded by Tom Gores in 1995, headquartered in Beverly Hills, California. The firm focuses on leveraged buyout investments of established companies in the U.S., Europe and Asia.

In June 2024, Platinum Equity ranked 40th on Private Equity International's PEI 300 ranking among the world's largest private equity firms.

== History ==
Platinum Equity was founded in 1995 by Tom Gores. The firm's first acquisition was LSI, a company that generated computer graphics to re-create accidents for courtroom testimony. After purchasing it for $200,000, Platinum Equity focused on serving existing customers and returning the company to profitability.

Over the next five years, between July 1996 and September 2001, the firm made 32 acquisitions amounting to $226 million, and realized $940 million on those investments. These acquisitions included a call center (Foresight Software), networking gear (Racal Electronics), and voice and data service (Williams Communications). BusinessWeek ranked the firm number 10 on its 1999 list of the country’s top 20 private IT organizations, based on 1998 revenues.

During this period of acquisition growth, additional partners joined the firm and several other joined through key acquisitions starting in 1999.

The firm’s first fund, Platinum Equity Capital Partners, was raised in 2004 and had a 62.5% net internal rate of return as of June 30, 2009. For the second fund, Platinum Equity Capital Partners II, which closed in September 2008, despite uncertainty in the financial markets. the firm initially sought a $1.5 billion leveraged buyout fund and nearly doubled it by raising $2.75 billion.

During the Great Recession, Platinum Equity acquired 14 companies in the first 11 months of 2009, eight of them full buyouts.

In 2011, Platinum Equity became a major sponsor of the Detroit Pistons when Gores purchased the club and became its owner. The company's logo has since been affixed to the Pistons courts, both at The Palace of Auburn Hills and Little Caesars Arena.

In 2017, Platinum Equity completed the acquisition of the Staples business in Australia and New Zealand from Staples Inc., relaunching it as Winc (Work Incorporated).

In 2018, Newell Brands sold Jostens to Platinum Equity for $1.3 billion.

== Investments ==
The firm is headquartered in Beverly Hills, California, with regional offices in Boston; Greenwich, Connecticut; New York City; London; and Singapore. In 2010, it ranked #31 on Forbes’ Largest Private Companies list for 2010 and #1 on the 2010 Los Angeles Business Journal list of LA's Largest Private Companies. The firm manages four private equity fund vehicles, Platinum Equity Capital Partners, Platinum Equity Capital Partners II, Platinum Equity Capital Partners III, and Platinum Equity Capital Partners IV, a $6.5 billion buyout fund.

=== Information technology ===
In October 2004, the firm completed the acquisition of CompuCom Systems, Inc. which was one of the largest public-to-private transactions in 2004. Then, in December 2004, the company acquired General Electric's IT Solutions division. The merger brought CompuCom to $1.7 billion in annual revenue and more than $500 million in services. The business was sold to Court Square Capital Partners in 2007. In 2014, Platinum Equity acquired 70% ownership of Australian marketing and directory services company Sensis for AU$454 million. In July 2021, the firm completed the acquisition of Ingram Micro.

=== Logistics and distribution ===
In 2002, Platinum combined Health Care Products, a division of Royal Philips Electronics, and Diagnostic Imaging, a subsidiary of PSS World Medical into a single company called SourceOne Healthcare Technologies. Both companies were distributors of radiology products like film, chemicals and lead shields. Together, they had $1.3 billion in revenue, making SourceOne dominant in the very fragmented $11.5 billion marketplace in which it competed. Merry X-Ray acquired SourceOne Healthcare Technologies from Platinum Equity in November 2005. In early 2019, Platinum Equity completed the purchase of customs broker and freight forwarder Livingston International for an undisclosed sum, acquiring the firm from Sterling Partners and the Canada Pension Plan Investment Board. In November 2020, Platinum announced the sale of PrimeSource, a global distributor of specialty building materials, to Clearlake Capital. Details of the sale were not disclosed.

In February 2025, it acquired Héroux-Devtek Inc. (TSX: HRX), a leading manufacturer of Platinum Equity international aerospace products and the world's third-largest landing gear maker.

=== Industrials ===
PNA Group, a metals processor, was acquired in May 2006 from TUI AG. At the time of acquisition, PNA included three companies. While in Platinum Equity’s portfolio PNA gained a seasoned metals CEO, Maurice S. Nelson Jr. and added three locations. Platinum Equity sold PNA Group to publicly traded Reliance Steel & Aluminum Co. (NYSE: RS) in August 2008 for $300 million. The purchase price, together with the $181 million in accumulated profits, represented 27 times Platinum’s original investment of $17.5 million just two years earlier. In December 2016, Platinum Equity acquired Emerson's Network Power business for over $4 billion, rebranding it as Vertiv. In August 2021, the firm completed the acquisition of SVP Worldwide.

=== Prison communication ===
In 2017, Platinum Equity acquired prison communication firm Securus Technologies. The firm came under pressure from criminal justice activists for its alleged excessive pricing for prison calls, borne primarily by poor and minority prisoners. In 2019, Platinum Equity announced plans to reorganize the company, and created Aventiv Technologies as Securus' new corporate parent.

In March 2024, lawsuits were filed, by multiple civil rights organizations, against Securus Technologies. The suits allege hundreds of jails in Michigan eliminated in-person visitation for family members, instead requiring Securus software be used for all communication.

Under the contract, "Securus pays the County 50 percent of the $12.99 price tag for every 20-minute video call and 78 percent of the $0.21 per minute cost of every phone call," the lawsuit said. The contract has "a guarantee that Securus would pay the County at least $190,000 each year," the St. Clair County lawsuit said.
