= Getronics =

Dutch ICT company

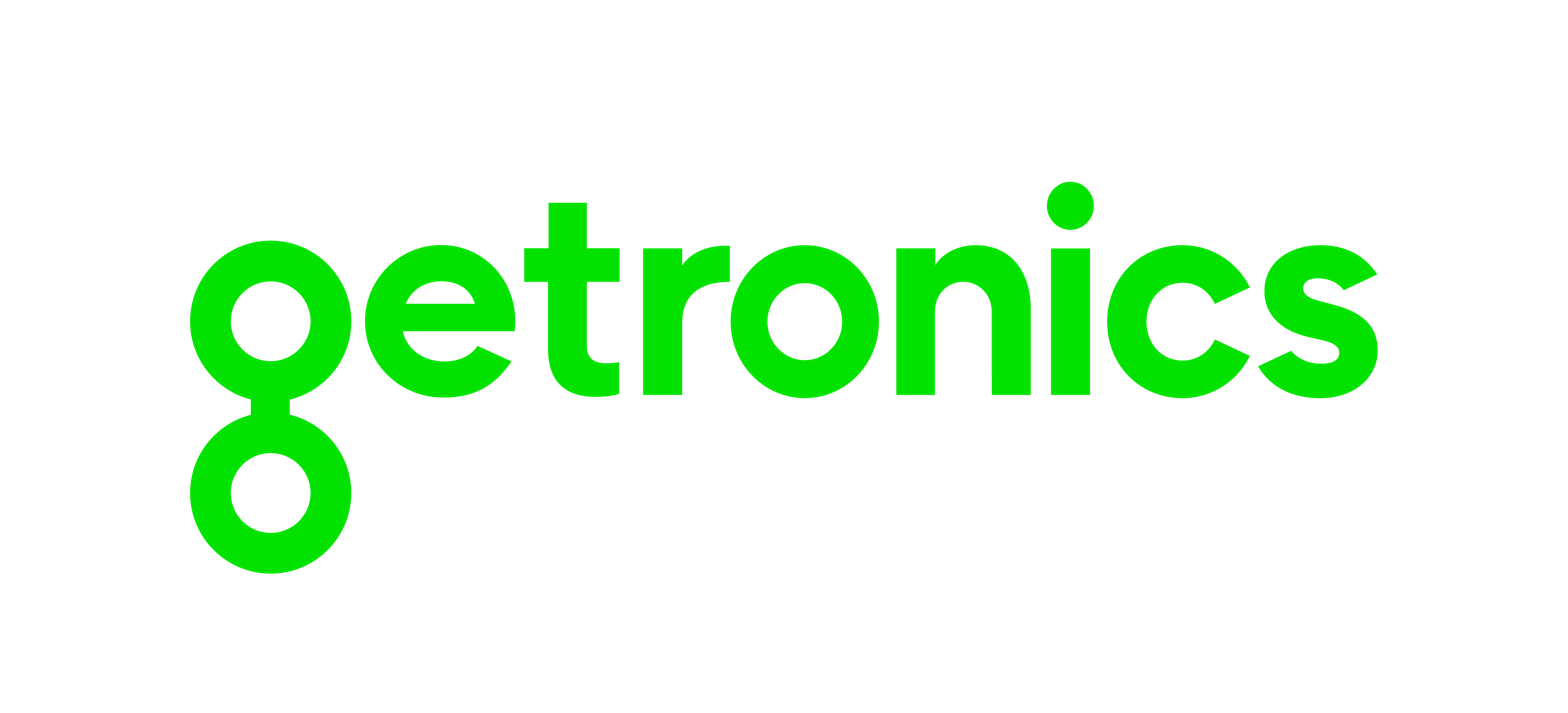
- Industry: IT Services, IT Consulting
- Founded: September 1, 1887; Electrical Factory N.V. part of Groeneveld, Van der Pol & Co (GVPC)
- Headquarters: The Joan, Joan Muyskenweg 30, 1114 AN Amsterdam, Netherlands
- Area served: Worldwide
- Key people: Stuart Deignan (CEO); Santiago Piacenza (COO); Elisabete Mleczak (CCO); Mike Field (CFO); Harsha Gowda (CTO)
- Services: Digital Workplace, Business Applications, Unified Communications, Data Center, Cloud Infrastructure, Smart Buildings, Consulting, Managed Services, IT Support, IT Outsourcing, Cybersecurity, Service Desk
- Number of employees: 4,000 (2024)
- Parent: GSH Private Capital
- Website: www.getronics.com

Logo as of 2000

Getronics is a Dutch-headquartered ICT services business, founded in 1887 and today employing approximately 4,000 employees across Europe, Asia Pacific, and Latin America. Getronics is also founding member of the Global Workspace Alliance, a consortium of leading local IT companies delivering IT services in over 180 countries.

In July 2020, GSH Private Capital acquired the business in a deal worth €200M. The company was refinanced and a new CEO installed by 2024.

== History ==
=== 1887–1988 ===
Getronics was founded in 1887 by Dutch firm N.V. Groeneveld, van der Poll & Co., which created Electrotechnische Fabriek Amsterdam, a subsidiary that specialized in electrical installations and maritime monitoring solutions.

In 1950, Groeneveld merged its sales and distribution department with Electrotechnische Fabriek Amsterdam, and changed the company’s name to Groenpol NV.

In 1985, Geveke was listed on the Amsterdam Stock Exchange.

=== 1988–2011 ===
Rebranded as Getronics NV in 1988, the company shifted toward IT services and networking. A pivotal moment came in 1999 with the acquisition of Wang Global, which expanded Getronics' footprint to 42 countries. The field services division acquired from Wang was spun off shortly thereafter, in 2000, as QualxServ; now known as Worldwide techservices, it is one of the primary contractors performing field warranty work for major computer manufacturers.

In 2007, Getronics was acquired by Dutch telecom giant KPN for €766 million. This led to operational restructuring, including the divestment of its U.S. division to CompuCom and the sale of business units to Capgemini and Total Specific Solutions between 2008 and 2009.

=== 2012–present ===
KPN sold the majority of Getronics' European and APAC operations to Aurelius Group in 2012, while LATAM operations were acquired separately. Under Aurelius, Getronics expanded through acquisitions, including NEC’s UCC business and Colt’s cloud services division.

In 2017, Bottega InvestCo acquired Getronics, fuelling further global expansion with the acquisition of U.S.-based Pomeroy. Subsequent ownership changes occurred, with GSH Private Capital taking control in 2020, followed by Cheyne Capital in 2023. In 2024, Cheyne refinanced the company and appointed Stuart Deignan as CEO.

As of 2020, Getronics had over 2000 customers and employed 4,000 employees across Europe, Asia Pacific, and Latin America.

== Global Workspace Alliance ==
Getronics heads the Global Workplace Alliance, a group of 11 companies that jointly deliver IT services in more than 180 countries

== PinkRoccade legacy ==
PinkRoccade was the first in the Netherlands to use the management method Information Technology Infrastructure Library. In 2001. the company developed the method ASL as a method of managing applications ('model Looijen'). This method is now being further developed under the by the ASL BiSL foundation.

The name PinkRoccade has returned to the company PinkRoccade Local Government ( 's-Hertogenbosch) and PinkRoccade Healthcare (Apeldoorn) which were taken over by Total Specific Solutions (TSS) KPN / Getronics in 2009.
