= Office automation =

Computer information software

Office automation (OA) refers to the varied computer machinery and software used to digitally create, collect, store, manipulate, and relay office information needed for accomplishing basic tasks. Raw data storage, electronic transfer, and the management of electronic business information comprise the basic activities of an office automation system. Office automation helps in optimizing or automating existing office procedures.

The backbone of office automation is a local area network, which allows users to transfer data, mail and voice across the network. All office functions, including dictation, typing, filing, copying, fax, telex, microfilm and records management, telephone and telephone switchboard operations, fall into this category. Office automation was a popular term in the 1970s and 1980s as the desktop computer exploded onto the scene. Advantages of office automation include that it can get many tasks accomplished faster, it eliminates the need for a large staff, less storage is required to store data, and multiple people can update data simultaneously in the event of changes in schedule.

== Outline ==
Businesses can easily purchase and stock their wares with the aid of technology. Many of the manual tasks that used to be done by hand can now be done through hand held devices and UPC and SKU coding. In the retail setting, automation also increases choice. Customers can easily process their payments through automated credit card machines and no longer have to wait in line for an employee to process and manually type in the credit card numbers.

Office payrolls have been automated, which means no one has to manually cut checks, and those checks that are cut can be printed through computer programs. Direct deposit can be automatically set up and this further reduces the manual process, and most employees who participate in direct deposit often find their paychecks come earlier than if they'd have to wait for their checks to be written and then cleared by the bank.

Other ways automation has reduced employee manpower on tasks is automated voice direction. Through the use of prompts, automated phone menus and directed calls, the need for employees to be dedicated to answer the phones has been reduced, and in some cases, eliminated.

== See also ==
- Apache OpenOffice
