= Cameo discography =

- Studio albums: 17
- Live albums: 6
- Compilation albums: 15
- Singles: 44

This discography documents albums and singles released by American R&B/funk band Cameo.

== Albums ==
=== Studio albums ===
List of studio albums, with selected details, chart positions and certifications
| Title | Details | Peak chart positions | | | | | | | | | Certifications |
| Title | Details | US Pop | US R&B | AUS | CAN | GER | NLD | NZ | SWI | UK | Certifications |
|---|---|---|---|---|---|---|---|---|---|---|---|
| Cardiac Arrest | Released: January 1977; Label: Chocolate City | 116 | 16 | — | — | — | — | — | — | — | — |
| We All Know Who We Are | Released: January 2, 1978; Label: Chocolate City | 58 | 15 | — | 72 | — | — | — | — | — | — |
| Ugly Ego | Released: September 25, 1978; Label: Chocolate City | 83 | 16 | — | — | — | — | — | — | — | — |
| Secret Omen | Released: June 25, 1979; Label: Chocolate City | 46 | 4 | — | — | — | — | — | — | — | RIAA: Gold |
| Cameosis | Released: April 24, 1980; Label: Chocolate City | 25 | 1 | — | — | — | — | — | — | — | RIAA: Gold |
| Feel Me | Released: October 6, 1980; Label: Chocolate City | 44 | 6 | — | — | — | — | — | — | — | RIAA: Gold |
| Knights of the Sound Table | Released: May 18, 1981; Label: Chocolate City | 44 | 2 | — | — | — | — | — | — | — | RIAA: Gold |
| Alligator Woman | Released: March 22, 1982; Label: Chocolate City | 23 | 6 | — | — | — | — | — | — | — | RIAA: Gold |
| Style | Released: April 11, 1983; Label: Atlanta Artists | 53 | 14 | — | — | — | — | — | — | — | — |
| She's Strange | Released: January 16, 1984; Label: Atlanta Artists | 27 | 1 | — | — | — | — | — | — | — | RIAA: Gold |
| Single Life | Released: June 17, 1985; Label: Atlanta Artists | 58 | 2 | — | — | — | — | — | — | 66 | RIAA: Gold |
| Word Up! | Released: September 9, 1986; Label: Atlanta Artists | 8 | 1 | 75 | 72 | 34 | 48 | 13 | 30 | 7 | RIAA: Platinum; BPI: Gold |
| Machismo | Released: October 17, 1988; Label: Atlanta Artists | 56 | 10 | — | — | — | — | — | — | 86 | RIAA: Gold |
| Real Men... Wear Black | Released: June 11, 1990; Label: Atlanta Artists | 84 | 18 | — | — | — | — | — | — | — | — |
| Emotional Violence | Released: 1992; Label: Reprise | — | 52 | — | — | — | — | — | — | — | — |
| In the Face of Funk | Released: 1994; Label: Way 2 Funky | — | 83 | — | — | — | — | — | — | — | — |
| Sexy Sweet Thing | Released: April 18, 2000; Label: BMD/Private I | — | 64 | — | — | — | — | — | — | — | — |
"—" denotes a recording that did not chart or was not released in that territory.

=== Live albums ===
- Nasty (1996, Intersound)
- Live: Word Up (1998, Universal)
- Original Artist Hit List (2003, Intersound)
- Nasty, Live & Funky (2007, Prestige)
- Word Up! Greatest Hits – Live (2007, Silver Star)
- Keep It Hot (2007, Sheridan Square)

=== Compilation albums ===
List of compilation albums, with selected details and chart positions
| Title | Details | Peak chart positions |
| Title | Details | US R&B |
|---|---|---|
| Shake Your Pants | Released: January 15, 1992; Label: PolyGram | — |
| The Best of Cameo | Released: May 18, 1993; Label: Mercury | 44 |
| The Best of Cameo, Volume 2 | Released: May 21, 1996; Label: Mercury | — |
| Best of Cameo | Released: April 8, 1998; Label: Universal | — |
| The Ballads Collection | Released: May 19, 1998; Label: PolyGram | — |
| Greatest Hits | Released: September 15, 1998; Label: PolyGram | — |
| 12″ Collection and More | Released: May 18, 1999; Label: PolyGram | — |
| The Hits Collection | Released: June 27, 2000; Label: Universal/Spectrum | — |
| 20th Century Masters – The Millennium Collection: The Best of Cameo | Released: February 6, 2001; Label: Mercury | — |
| Anthology | Released: June 18, 2002; Label: Mercury | — |
| Classic Cameo | Released: March 3, 2003; Label: Mercury | — |
| The Best of Cameo | Released: November 23, 2004; Label: Universal | — |
| Gold | Released: July 26, 2005; Label: Mercury | — |
| The Definitive Collection | Released: March 14, 2006; Label: Mercury | — |
| Fresh Takes | Released: May 25, 2018; Label: Entertainment One U.S. LP | — |
"—" denotes a recording that did not chart or was not released in that territory.

== Singles ==
List of singles, with selected chart positions and certifications, showing year released and album name
| Title | Year | Peak chart positions | | | | | | | Certifications | Album |
| Title | Year | US | US R&B | US Dance | AUS | GER | IRE | UK | Certifications | Album |
|---|---|---|---|---|---|---|---|---|---|---|
| "Find My Way" | 1976 | — | — | 3 | — | — | — | — | | Cardiac Arrest |
| "Rigor Mortis" | 1977 | 103 | 33 | — | — | — | — | — | | Cardiac Arrest |
| "Post Mortem" | 1977 | — | 70 | — | — | — | — | — | | Cardiac Arrest |
| "Funk Funk" | 1977 | 104 | 20 | — | — | — | — | — | | Cardiac Arrest |
| "It's Serious" | 1978 | — | 21 | 29 | — | — | — | — | | We All Know Who We Are |
| "It's Over" | 1978 | — | 60 | — | — | — | — | — | | We All Know Who We Are |
| "Insane" | 1978 | — | 17 | — | — | — | — | — | | Ugly Ego |
| "Give Love a Chance" | 1979 | — | 76 | — | — | — | — | — | | Ugly Ego |
| "I Just Want to Be" | 1979 | — | 3 | 52 | — | — | — | — | | Secret Omen |
| "Sparkle" | 1979 | — | 10 | — | — | — | — | — | | Secret Omen |
| "We're Goin' Out Tonight" | 1980 | — | 11 | — | — | — | — | — | | Cameosis |
| "Shake Your Pants" | 1980 | — | 8 | 57 | — | — | — | — | | Cameosis |
| "Keep It Hot" | 1980 | — | 4 | 77 | — | — | — | — | | Feel Me |
| "Feel Me" | 1981 | — | 27 | — | — | — | — | — | | Feel Me |
| "Freaky Dancin'" | 1981 | 102 | 3 | 45 | — | — | — | — | | Knights of the Sound Table |
| "I Like It" | 1981 | — | 25 | — | — | — | — | — | | Knights of the Sound Table |
| "Just Be Yourself" | 1982 | 101 | 12 | — | — | — | — | — | | Alligator Woman |
| "Flirt" | 1982 | — | 10 | — | — | — | — | — | | Alligator Woman |
| "Alligator Woman" | 1982 | — | 54 | — | — | — | — | — | | Alligator Woman |
| "Style" | 1983 | — | 14 | — | — | — | — | — | | Style |
| "Slow Movin'" | 1983 | — | 47 | — | — | — | — | — | | Style |
| "She's Strange" | 1984 | 47 | 1 | 25 | — | 46 | — | 37 | | She's Strange |
| "Talkin' Out the Side of Your Neck" | 1984 | — | 21 | — | — | — | — | — | | She's Strange |
| "Hangin' Downtown" | 1984 | — | 45 | — | — | — | — | — | | She's Strange |
| "Attack Me with Your Love" | 1985 | — | 3 | 39 | — | — | — | 65 | | Single Life |
| "Single Life" | 1985 | — | 2 | 26 | — | — | 28 | 15 | | Single Life |
| "A Good-Bye" | 1985 | — | 76 | — | — | — | — | 65 | | Single Life |
| "She's Strange" (Cameo Megamix) | 1985 | — | — | — | — | — | — | 22 | | Non-album single |
| "Word Up!" | 1986 | 6 | 1 | 1 | 6 | 3 | 8 | 3 | BPI: Gold | Word Up! |
| "Candy" | 1986 | 21 | 1 | 10 | — | — | 21 | 27 | BPI: Silver | Word Up! |
| "Back and Forth" | 1987 | 50 | 3 | 6 | — | — | 10 | 11 | | Word Up! |
| "She's Mine" | 1987 | — | — | — | — | — | — | 35 | | Word Up! |
| "You Make Me Work" | 1988 | 85 | 4 | 45 | — | — | — | 74 | | Machismo |
| "Skin I'm In" | 1988 | — | 5 | — | — | — | — | 79 | | Machismo |
| "Pretty Girls" | 1989 | — | 52 | — | — | — | — | — | | Machismo |
| "I Want It Now" | 1990 | — | 5 | — | — | — | — | — | | Real Men... Wear Black |
| "Close Quarters" | 1990 | — | 38 | — | — | — | — | — | | Real Men... Wear Black |
| "Emotional Violence" | 1992 | — | 47 | — | — | — | — | — | | Emotional Violence |
| "That Kind of Guy" | 1992 | — | 53 | — | — | — | — | — | | Emotional Violence |
| "Money" | 1992 | — | — | 4 | — | — | — | — | | Emotional Violence |
| "Slyde" | 1994 | — | 57 | — | — | — | — | — | | In the Face of Funk |
| "You Are My Love" | 1995 | — | 99 | — | — | — | — | — | | In the Face of Funk |
| "Loverboy" (with Mariah Carey) | 2001 | 2 | 1 | 45 | 7 | 57 | 50 | 12 | ARIA: Gold | Glitter |
| "El Passo" | 2019 | — | — | — | — | — | — | — | | Non-album single |
"—" denotes a recording that did not chart or was not released in that territory.
