= Anthology (Cameo album) =

Greatest hits album by Cameo
- Released: June 18, 2002
- Genre: R&B, funk
- Label: Mercury
- Producer: Larry Blackmon

Cameo chronology
The Millennium Collection: The Best of Cameo (2001)	Anthology (2002)	Original Artist Hit List (2003)

Gold re-release

Professional ratings
Review scores
Source	Rating
Allmusic	link

Anthology is a 2-disc greatest hits album released by the funk/R&B group Cameo in 2002. The collection is arguably the best representation of Cameo released to date, containing 23 of their 26 Top-40 R&B hits, though the top 5 single "You Make Me Work" is not present. This collection was repackaged and retitled as Gold three years later.

== Track listing ==
=== Disc 1 ===
1. "Rigor Mortis" – 5:22 - Blackmon/Leftenant/Leftenant (from Cardiac Arrest, 1977)
2. "Post Mortem" – 4:22 - Blackmon/Johnson (from Cardiac Arrest, 1977)
3. "Funk Funk" – 4:49 - Blackmon (from Cardiac Arrest, 1977)
4. "Find My Way" – 5:00 - Melfi (from Cardiac Arrest, 1977)
5. "It's Serious" – 8:08 - Blackmon/Johnson (from We All Know Who We Are, 1977)
6. "We All Know Who We Are" – 5:53 - Blackmon (from We All Know Who We Are, 1977)
7. "Insane" – 4:58 - Blackmon (from Ugly Ego, 1978)
8. "I Just Want to Be" [12" version] – 6:19 - Blackmon/Johnson (from Secret Omen, 1979)
9. "Sparkle" – 4:54 - Blackmon/Lockett (from Secret Omen, 1979)
10. "Shake Your Pants" – 6:24 - Blackmon (from Cameosis, 1980)
11. "We're Goin' Out Tonight" – 4:42 - Blackmon/Jenkins/Leftenant (from Cameosis, 1980)
12. "Why Have I Lost You" [Version 2] – 5:15 - Blackmon (from Cameosis, 1980)
13. "Keep It Hot" – 4:44 - Blackmon/Lockett (from Feel Me, 1980)
14. "Feel Me" – 6:09 - Blackmon/Lockett (from Feel Me, 1980)

=== Disc 2 ===
1. "Freaky Dancin'" – 5:23 - Blackmon/Jenkins (from Knights of the Sound Table, 1981)
2. "Don't Be So Cool" – 4:14 - Blackmon/Mills (from Knights of the Sound Table, 1981)
3. "Just Be Yourself" – 4:09 - Blackmon/Jenkins/Singleton (from Alligator Woman, 1982)
4. "Flirt" – 4:09 - Blackmon/Jenkins(from Alligator Woman, 1982)
5. "Alligator Woman"/"Secrets of Time" – 6:37 - Blackmon/Jenkins/Singleton (from Alligator Woman, 1982)
6. "Style" [Single version] – 4:18 - Blackmon/Jenkins/Leftenant/Singleton (from Style, 1983)
7. "She's Strange" – 7:12 - Blackmon/Jenkins/Leftenant/Singleton (from She's Strange, 1984)
8. "Talkin' Out the Side of Your Neck" – 4:07 - Blackmon/Jenkins/Leftenant/Singleton (from She's Strange, 1984)
9. "Hangin' Downtown" – 5:09 - Hairston (from She's Strange, 1984)
10. "Attack Me With Your Love" – 4:33 - Blackmon/Kendrick (from Single Life, 1985)
11. "Single Life – 4:28 - Blackmon/Jenkins (from Single Life, 1985)
12. "Word Up!" – 4:21 - Blackmon/Jenkins (from Word Up!, 1986)
13. "Candy" – 5:41 - Blackmon/Jenkins (from Word Up!, 1986)
14. "Back and Forth" – 3:53 - Blackmon/Jenkins/Kendrick/Leftenant (from Word Up!, 1986)
15. "Skin I'm In" [single version] – 4:38 - Blackmon (from Machismo, 1988)
16. "I Want It Now" [single version] – 4:29 - Allen/Blackmon/Smith (from Real Men... Wear Black, 1990)
