= The Definitive Collection (Cameo album) =

Greatest hits album by Cameo
- Released: March 14, 2006
- Genre: R&B, funk
- Label: Mercury
- Producer: Larry Blackmon

Cameo chronology
Gold (2005)	The Definitive Collection (2006)	Nasty, Live & Funky (2007)

Professional ratings
Review scores
Source	Rating
AllMusic	3/5 stars

The Definitive Collection is the latest of many greatest hits albums by the funk/R&B group Cameo. It emphasizes the band's hits from the 1980s, similar to the European release Classic Cameo.

== Track listing ==
1. "Word Up!" – Blackmon/Jenkins
2. "Single Life" – Blackmon/Jenkins
3. "Candy" – Blackmon/Jenkins
4. "She's Strange" – Blackmon/Jenkins/Leftenant/Singleton
5. "Sparkle" – Blackmon/Lockett
6. "I Just Want to Be" – Blackmon/Johnson
7. "Shake Your Pants" – Blackmon
8. "Rigor Mortis" – Blackmon/Leftenant/Leftenant
9. "Attack Me with Your Love" – Blackmon/Kendrick
10. "Back and Forth" – Blackmon/Jenkins/Kendrick/Leftenant
11. "Why Have I Lost You" [Version 2] – Blackmon
12. "Flirt" – Blackmon/Jenkins
13. "Skin I'm In" [Single version] – Blackmon
14. "Talkin' Out the Side of Your Neck" – Blackmon/Jenkins/Leftenant/Singleton
15. "Keep It Hot" – Blackmon/Lockett
16. "Freaky Dancin'" – Blackmon/Jenkins
17. "Just Be Yourself" – Blackmon/Jenkins/Singleton
