= Keep It Hot =

Live album by Cameo
- Released: October 9, 2007
- Genre: R&B
- Label: Sheridan Square
- Producer: Larry Blackmon

Cameo chronology
Word Up! Greatest Hits - Live (2007)	Keep It Hot (2007)

Keep It Hot is a live album released by the funk/R&B group Cameo in 2007. In addition to the live material, two studio tracks were included: "Come Fly With Me" and "Nasty", both written by Larry Blackmon. The "Mega-Mix" is a remix of the album's live tracks. This album is the third album in 2007 to be a nearly track for track re-release of Nasty from 1996. However, Nasty's "Mega-Mix" was left off in favor of three new tracks.

== Track listing ==
1. "Intro" – 1:03
2. "Flirt" – 1:36 (Blackmon, Jenkins)
3. "She's Strange" – 2:37 (Blackmon, Jenkins, Leftenant, Singleton)
4. "Back and Forth" – 5:54 (Blackmon, Jenkins, Kendrick, Leftenant)
5. "Skin I'm In" – 5:09 (Blackmon)
6. "Why Have I Lost You" – 6:10 (Blackmon)
7. "Sparkle" – 4:23 (Blackmon, Lockett)
8. "Candy" – 4:45 (Blackmon, Jenkins)
9. "Shake Your Pants" (Intro) – 0:42
10. "Shake Your Pants" – 4:00 (Blackmon)
11. "I Just Want to Be" – 1:38 (Blackmon, Johnson)
12. "Keep It Hot" – 5:12 (Blackmon, Lockett)
13. "Word Up!" – 6:44 (Blackmon, Jenkins)
14. "Come Fly With Me" – 3:57 (Blackmon)
15. "Nasty" – 3:44 (Blackmon)
16. "Let Me Put Love on Your Mind" – X:XX (Cameo)
17. "Heartbeat" – X:XX (Cameo, Andrews, Ronnie)
18. "No Hiding Place" – X:XX (Cameo, Wilson, Ronnie)
