= Word Up =

Word Up or Word Up! may refer to:

- Word Up! (album), a 1986 album by Cameo
  - "Word Up!" (song), its title song, which has also been covered by several artists
- Word Up! Greatest Hits – Live, 2007 live album by Cameo
- Word Up! (magazine), a teen magazine marketed to African Americans
- Word Up (video game) (also known as Word Soup), a computer pub game popular in the UK
- "Word Up", a 1982 single by Legacy
- WordUp (program), a word processor for the Atari ST
- "Word Up!", catch phrase of PBS animated superhero WordGirl
