= The Best of Cameo =

The Best of Cameo is the name of two albums:

- The Best of Cameo (1993 album)
- The Best of Cameo (2004 album)

== See also ==
- Best of Cameo
