= I Want It Now =

Single by Cameo

from the album Real Men... Wear Black
- Released: 1990
- Genre: R&B; new jack swing
- Label: Atlanta Artists/Mercury
- Songwriter(s): Larry Blackmon; Robert Smith; William Seth Allen
- Producer(s): Larry Blackmon

Cameo singles chronology
"Pretty Girls" (1989)	"I Want It Now" (1990)	"Close Quarters" (1990)

Music video
- "I Want It Now" on YouTube

"I Want It Now" is a song recorded by American funk band Cameo from their fourteenth studio album, Real Men... Wear Black (1990). It was released as a single by Atlanta Artists/Mercury Records and reached No. 5 on the US Billboard Hot R&B Singles chart.

== Critical reception ==
People declared, "Pushed by a killer bass riff, 'I Want It Now' bubbles like a craterful of lava." Don Waller of the New York Times found that "Cameo rolls back the rug for a wall-to-off-the-wall dance party, with the house-of-whacks "I Want It Now" and the over-the-counter Afro-desiac "Nan-Yea" providing the most innovative moments. Chris Heim of the Chicago Tribune called the song a "catchy, Sly-styled pop funk tune".

== Charts ==
Chart (1990)	Peak position
US Hot R&B/Hip-Hop Songs (Billboard)	5
