= Original Artist Hit List =

Live album by Cameo
- Released: January 28, 2003
- Genre: R&B, funk
- Length: 64:08
- Label: Intersound
- Producer: Larry Blackmon

Cameo chronology
| Anthology (2002) | Original Artist Hit List (2003) | Classic Cameo (2003) |

Professional ratings
Review scores
| Source | Rating |
|---|---|
| Allmusic | link |

Original Artist Hit List is a live album released by the funk/R&B group Cameo in 2003. In addition to the live material, two studio tracks were included: "Come Fly With Me", and "Nasty", both written by Larry Blackmon. The "Mega-Mix" is a remix of the album's live tracks. This album is a track for track re-release of Nasty from 1996. The album was simply retitled and given new cover art.

== Track listing ==
1. "Intro" – 1:03
2. "Flirt" – 1:36 – Blackmon, Jenkins
3. "She's Strange" – 2:37 – Blackmon, Jenkins, Leftenant, Singleton
4. "Back and Forth" – 5:54 – Blackmon, Jenkins, Kendrick, Leftenant
5. "Skin I'm In" – 5:09 – Blackmon
6. "Why Have I Lost You" – 6:10 – Blackmon
7. "Sparkle" – 4:23 – Blackmon, Lockett
8. "Candy" – 4:45 – Blackmon, Jenkins
9. "Shake Your Pants" (Intro) – 0:42
10. "Shake Your Pants" – 4:00 – Blackmon
11. "I Just Want to Be" – 1:38 – Blackmon, Johnson
12. "Keep It Hot" – 5:12 – Blackmon, Lockett
13. "Word Up!" – 6:44 – Blackmon, Jenkins
14. "Come Fly With Me" – 3:57 – Blackmon
15. "Nasty" – 3:44 – Blackmon
16. "Mega-Mix" – 6:27 – Cameo
