= Sexy Sweet Thing =

Studio album by Cameo
- Released: April 18, 2000
- Recorded: 1999–2000
- Genre: Funk; new jack swing
- Length: 61:05
- Label: Crash; Private I
- Producer: Larry Blackmon

Cameo chronology
12" Collection and More (1999)	Sexy Sweet Thing (2000)	The Hits Collection (2000)

Professional ratings
Review scores
Source	Rating
AllMusic	3/5 stars

Sexy Sweet Thing is a 2000 album by the funk group Cameo. This 13-track release was Cameo's first full album of new material since In the Face of Funk in 1994, and peaked at No. 64 on the Billboard Top R&B/Hip-Hop Albums chart on June 24, 2000. To date, this is the last album released by Cameo. Sexy Sweet Thing was followed up by the single "El Passo" in 2019, which did not chart, making this record their latest to enter any charts.

== Track listing ==
No.	Title	Writer(s)	Length
1.	"Sexy Sweet Thing"	Blackmon; Fleming	4:18
2.	"Antidote"	Blackmon; Clemon; Fleming	4:43
3.	"I Wake Up"	Blackmon; Fleming; Thomas	4:32
4.	"She Wants Some More"	Blackmon; Clemon; Jenkins	4:08
5.	"Time for Love"	Clemon; Jenkins; Ziegler	4:04
6.	"Your Love"	Blackmon	4:31
7.	"Same Dream"	Jenkins	3:37
8.	"You Make Me Crazy"	Blackmon	5:19
9.	"Another Crazy Day"	Blackmon; Clemon	2:20
10.	"Ready for Love"	Blackmon; Chocolate; Jenkins; Ziegler	5:31
11.	"Pre Rolled Blunt"	Blackmon; Jenkins	4:28
12.	"Special Love"	Blackmon; Jenkins	1:55
13.	"Baby It's You"	Blackmon	5:27
