= In the Face of Funk =

Studio album by Cameo
- Released: 1994
- Recorded: 1993–1994
- Studio: Kudgit Sound Studio
- Label: Way Too Funky
- Producer: Larry Blackmon

Cameo chronology
The Best of Cameo (1993)	In the Face of Funk (1994)	The Best of Cameo, Volume 2 (1996)

Professional ratings
Review scores
Source	Rating
AllMusic	2/5 stars
Cash Box	(favorable)
The Encyclopedia of Popular Music	2/5 stars

In the Face of Funk is a studio album by the funk group Cameo, released in 1994. It was their first album of newly written material since 1992's Emotional Violence. The album reached No. 83 on Billboard's R&B chart. Apart from two new studio tracks on the 1996 live album, Nasty, Cameo did not release another album of new material until 2000.

The album was mostly recorded at Kudgit Sound Studio, in Los Cerrillos, New Mexico.

== Track listing ==
1. "In the Face of Funk"
2. "Slyde"
3. "You Are My Love"
4. "Desire"
5. "Don't Say It's Over"
6. "BSU"
7. "The Man"
8. "A Special Love"
9. "We Can Make It Happen"
10. "Where"

== Charts ==
- Top R&B/Hip-Hop Albums – No. 83

== Singles ==
- "Slyde" - released September 27, 1994
- "You Are My Love" - released February 13, 1995
