= Feel Me =

Feel Me may refer to:

- Feel Me (album), a 1980 album by Cameo
- "Feel Me" (Blancmange song), 1982
- Feel Me (Selena Gomez song), 2020
- "Feel Me" (Tyga song), 2017
