= Word Up! Greatest Hits – Live =

Word Up! Greatest Hits - Live

Live album by Cameo
- Released: June 1, 2007
- Genre: R&B, funk
- Length: 64:08
- Label: Silver Star
- Producer: Larry Blackmon

Cameo chronology
Nasty, Live & Funky (2007)	Word Up! Greatest Hits - Live (2007)	Keep It Hot (2007)

Word Up! Greatest Hits – Live is a live album released by the funk/R&B group Cameo in 2007. In addition to the live material, two studio tracks were included: "Come Fly With Me" and "Nasty", both written by Larry Blackmon. The "Mega-Mix" is a remix of the album's live tracks.

== Track listing ==
1. "Intro" – 1:03
2. "Flirt" – 1:36 - Blackmon, Jenkins
3. "She's Strange" – 2:37 - Blackmon, Jenkins, Leftenant, Singleton
4. "Back and Forth" – 5:54 - Blackmon, Jenkins, Kendrick, Leftenant
5. "Skin I'm In" – 5:09 - Blackmon
6. "Why Have I Lost You" – 6:10 - Blackmon
7. "Sparkle" – 4:23 - Blackmon, Lockett
8. "Candy" – 4:45 - Blackmon, Jenkins
9. "Shake Your Pants" (Intro) – 0:42
10. "Shake Your Pants" – 4:00 - Blackmon
11. "I Just Want to Be" – 1:38 - Blackmon, Johnson
12. "Keep It Hot" – 5:12 - Blackmon, Lockett
13. "Word Up!" – 6:44 - Blackmon, Jenkins
14. "Come Fly With Me" – 3:57 - Blackmon
15. "Nasty" – 3:44 - Blackmon
16. "Megamix" – 6:29 - Cameo
