= Back and Forth (Cameo song) =

1987 single by Cameo

Single by Cameo

from the album Word Up!
- Released: February 24, 1987
- Recorded: 1986
- Genre: Dance-pop
- Length: 6:33 (album version); 3:54 (single version)
- Label: Atlanta Artists
- Songwriters: Larry Blackmon; Tomi Jenkins; Kevin Kendrick; Nathan Leftenant

Cameo singles chronology
"Candy" (1986)	"Back and Forth" (1987)	"She's Mine" (1987)

Music video
- "Back and Forth" on YouTube

"Back and Forth" is a song by American funk band Cameo, released on February 24, 1987, as the third single from their 1986 album Word Up!.

== Chart performance ==
The single was the group's twelfth top 10 soul single peaking at number three for two weeks and peaked at number fifty on the pop charts making it their fourth entry on the Hot 100. "Back and Forth" was also the group's third top ten on the dance chart, peaking at number six.

== Music video ==
Jazz musician Miles Davis makes a cameo in the song's music video.

== Popular culture ==
- The chorus of the song: "Back, back and forth and forth..." is used on the hip hop group Wu-Tang Clan's single "Gravel Pit".
- The song appears in video game Grand Theft Auto V on the Space 103.2 radio station.
- Producer R. Kelly sampled Back and Forth on Aaliyah's 1994 hit single Back & Forth.

== Charts ==
=== Weekly charts ===
Chart (1987)	Peak position
Belgium (Ultratop 50 Flanders)	40
UK Singles (OCC)	11
US Billboard Hot 100	50
US Dance Club Songs (Billboard)	6
US Hot R&B/Hip-Hop Songs (Billboard)	3

=== Year-end charts ===
Chart (1987)	Position
US Hot R&B/Hip-Hop Songs (Billboard)	50
