= The Ballads Collection =

Compilation album by Cameo
- Released: May 19, 1998
- Length: 57:35
- Label: Polygram
- Producer: Larry Blackmon

Cameo chronology
Live: Word Up (1998)	The Ballads Collection (1998)	Greatest Hits (1998)

Professional ratings
Review scores
Source	Rating
Allmusic	link

The Ballads Collection is a compilation album released by the funk group Cameo in 1998.

== Track listing ==
1. "Why Have I Lost You" – 4:43 - Blackmon
2. "Sparkle" – 4:51 - Blackmon, Lockett
3. "It's Over" – 4:16 - Blackmon, Jenkins, Leftenant
4. "Feel Me" – 6:08 - Blackmon, Lockett
5. "We All Know Who We Are" – 5:52 - Blackmon
6. "Hangin' Downtown" – 5:06 - Hairston
7. "Love You Anyway" – 4:49 - Singleton, Wells
8. "Don't Be Lonely" – 5:14 - Blackmon, Jenkins, Kendrick, Morris
9. "I Owe It All to You" – 2:54 - Blackmon
10. "I'll Always Stay" – 3:52 - Blackmon, Lockett
11. "I Never Knew" – 4:36 - Blackmon, Lockett
12. "Why Have I Lost You" – 5:14 - Blackmon
