= The Best of Cameo (2004 album) =

Greatest hits album by Cameo
- Released: November 23, 2004
- Genre: R&B, funk
- Label: Collectables
- Producer: Larry Blackmon

Cameo chronology
Classic Cameo (2003)	The Best of Cameo (2004)	Gold (2005)

Professional ratings
Review scores
Source	Rating
Allmusic	link

The Best of Cameo is a compilation album released by the funk/R&B group Cameo in 2004. It is not to be confused with the 1993 release The Best of Cameo. However, it is a repackaging of the 1998 issue of Best of Cameo, but with "The" added to the album's title, even using the same cover art. A more complete, career-spanning compilation, Gold, was released in 2005.

== Track listing ==
1. "She's Strange" – Blackmon, Jenkins, Leftenant, Singleton
2. "I Just Want to Be" – Blackmon, Johnson
3. "Shake Your Pants" – Blackmon
4. "I'll Always Stay" – Blackmon, Lockett
5. "Flirt" – Blackmon, Jenkins
6. "I Like It" – Blackmon, Campbell, Lockett, Mills
7. "Be Yourself" – Blackmon, Jenkins
8. "I Care for You" – Blackmon, Jenkins, Singleton
9. "Feel Me" – Blackmon, Lockett
10. "Keep It Hot" – Blackmon, Lockett
11. "The Rock" – Blackmon
