= Attack Me with Your Love =

Single by Cameo

from the album Single Life
- Released: February 15, 1985
- Genre: R&B
- Label: Atlanta Artists
- Songwriters: Larry Blackmon; Kevin Kendrick

Cameo singles chronology
| "Hangin' Downtown" (1984) | "Attack Me with Your Love" (1985) | "Single Life" (1985) |

Music video
- "Attack Me with Your Love" on YouTube

"Attack Me with Your Love" is a song by American funk band Cameo, released on February 15, 1985, as a single from their eleventh studio album, Single Life. It became a top 5 R&B hit and a top 40 dance hit in America.

== Music video ==
The music video for "Attack Me with Your Love" was set in New York City and included appearances by Debbi Morgan, Tom Wright, Spike Lee, Savion Glover, Maurice Hines, and Laurence Fishburne.

== Charts ==
| Chart (1985) | Peak position |
|---|---|
| US Dance Club Songs (Billboard) | 39 |
| US Hot R&B/Hip-Hop Songs (Billboard) | 3 |
