= The Best of Cameo, Volume 2 =

Greatest hits album by Cameo
- Released: May 21, 1996
- Length: 77:58
- Label: Mercury
- Producer: Larry Blackmon

Cameo chronology
In the Face of Funk (1994)	The Best of Cameo, Volume 2 (1996)	Nasty (1996)

Professional ratings
Review scores
Source	Rating
Allmusic	4.5/5 stars

The Best of Cameo, Volume 2 is a follow-up greatest hits album released by the funk group Cameo in 1996. Complementing The Best of Cameo from 1993, this collection focuses on Cameo's lesser hits, but combined with the first volume, it spans nearly their entire career and offers a true presentation of the band.

== Track listing ==
1. "Don't Be So Cool" – 4:12 - Blackmon/Mills
2. "I Want It Now" – 4:29 - Allen/Blackmon/Smith
3. "In the Night" – 4:40 - Blackmon/DePayer
4. "We're Goin' Out Tonight" – 4:39 - Blackmon/Jenkins/Leftenant
5. "Why Have I Lost You" – 5:14 - Blackmon
6. "Hangin' Downtown" – 5:06 - Hairston
7. "It's Serious" – 8:07 - Blackmon/Johnson
8. "Freaky Dancin'" – 5:20 - Blackmon/Jenkins
9. "Keep It Hot" – 4:41 - Blackmon/Lockett
10. "Be Yourself" – 4:07 - Blackmon/Jenkins/Singleton
11. "Alligator Woman" – 3:39 - Blackmon/Jenkins/Singleton
12. "Insane" – 4:56 - Blackmon
13. "We All Know Who We Are" – 5:51 - Blackmon
14. "Feel Me" – 6:08 - Blackmon/Lockett
15. "Your Love Takes Me Out" – 6:39 - Blackmon
