= Héritage =

Héritage is a French word which means both "inheritance" and "legacy". It may refer to:

- Héritage (Canadian store), a former Canadian supermarket chain
- Héritage, the French name of the 2012 movie Inheritance

== See also ==
- Heritage (disambiguation)
