= Ca$hflow =

Ca$hflow is an American soul music act, first active in the 1980s.

== History ==
The band was originally made up of Gaylord Parsons (vocals/drum), Kary Hubbert (lead vocals), James Duffie (keyboards/vocals) and Regis Ferguson (keyboards). The band was disclvoered by Larry Blackmon of Cameo, who signed it to his Atlanta Artists label.

The relationship with Cameo extended to being their support act on a tour in the United Kingdom in 1986, and off the back of that Ca$hflow enjoyed one hit single in Britain, the double a side "Mine All Mine/Party Freak", which peaked at number 15 in the UK Singles Chart in June 1986; this earned them a slot on the 5 June edition of music show Top of the Pops. A follow-up single, "Can't Let Love Pass Us By", made the bubbling under section three months later, and the band's self-title parent album reached number 33 in the UK album charts.

Ca$hflow had a run of hit singles on the Billboard Hot Black Singles, the biggest being "Party Freak", which topped out at number 8 in April 1986, and the eponymous debut album made the Billboard 200, peaking at 144. The band was still active in 2026, made up of Parsons, Duffie, and Max Spaulding.
