= Long Gone =

Long Gone may refer to:

== Songs ==
- "Long Gone (instrumental)", a 1948 instrumental song by Sonny Thompson
- "Long Gone" (Six60 song)
- "Long Gone" (Super Furry Animals song), from the album 1996 Fuzzy Logic
- "Long Gone", a song by Bryan Adams from the 1984 album Reckless
- "Long Gone", a song by Syd Barrett from the 1970 album The Madcap Laughs
- "Long Gone", a song by Chris Cornell from the 2009 album Scream
- "Long Gone", a song by Guy from the 1990 album The Future
- "Long Gone", a song by Juice Wrld from the 2018 album Goodbye & Good Riddance
- "Long Gone", a song by Lady Antebellum from the 2008 album Lady Antebellum
- "Long Gone", a song by Nelly from the 2010 album 5.0
- "Long Gone", a song by George Thorogood and the Destroyers from the 1985 album Maverick

== Other uses ==
- Luke "Long Gone" Miles (born 1925), an American blues singer
- Long Gone (film), a 1987 baseball film
- Long Gone (album), a 1997 album by Jimmy D. Lane
