= Legacy =

Legacy or Legacies may refer to:

== Arts and entertainment ==
=== Comics ===
- "Batman: Legacy", a 1996 Batman storyline
- DC Universe: Legacies, a comic book series from DC Comics
- Legacy, a 1999 quarterly series from Antarctic Press
- Legacy, a 2003–2005 series released by Dabel Brothers Productions
- Legacy, an alternate name for the DC supervillain Wizard
- Legacy (Marvel Comics), an alias used by Genis-Vell, better known as Captain Marvel
- Marvel Legacy, a comic book line introduced in 2017
- Star Wars: Legacy, a 2006 series from Dark Horse
- X-Men: Legacy, a 1991 series from Marvel Comics
- Legacy Virus, a fictional virus from the Marvel Universe

=== Film ===
- Legacy, a 1975 American film starring Joan Hotchkis
- Legacy: A Mormon Journey, a 1990 film produced by The Church of Jesus Christ of Latter-day Saints
- Legacy (1998 film), an American film starring David Hasselhoff
- Legacy (2000 film), an American documentary film
- Legacy (2008 film), alternate title for the American film Pretty Little Devils
- Legacy (2010 film), a British-Nigerian film starring Idris Elba
- Legacy (2013 film), a British television film on BBC Two, based on the Alan Judd novel
- Tron: Legacy, a 2010 sequel to Tron
- The Craft: Legacy, a 2020 sequel to The Craft

=== Games ===
- Legacy (role-playing game), a tabletop role-playing game
- Star Trek: Legacy, a 2006 computer game by Mad Doc Software and Bethesda Softworks
- Legacy, a constructed format in Magic: The Gathering
- Legacy, a 2023 computer game developed by 22cans

=== Literature ===
- Legacy (journal), a scholarly journal, founded in 1984
- Legacy (Michener novel), a 1987 historical-fiction novel by James A. Michener
- Legacy (Russell novel), a 1994 Doctor Who spin-off novel by Gary Russell
- Legacy, a 1995 science-fiction novel in Greg Bear's The Way series
- Legacy, a 1995 science-fiction novel by Steve White
- Legacies (novel), a 1998 Repairman Jack novel by F. Paul Wilson
- Legacy (Judd novel), a 2001 spy novel by Alan Judd
- Legacy (Bujold novel), a 2007 fantasy novel in Lois McMaster Bujold's The Sharing Knife series
- Legacy (novel series), a series of novels by Cayla Kluver; also the first book of the series published in 2008
- Legacy (novella), a 2017 novella and coloring book by Chuck Palahniuk
- Legacy: One Family, a Cup of Tea, and the Company who took on the World, a 2019 history of J. Lyons and Co. by Thomas Harding

=== Music ===
==== Performers ====
- Dire Straits Legacy, a revival of the band Dire Straits
- Legacy (soul group), a former American band, formed in 1979
- Legacy, the original band name of Testament
- Legacy, a band founded by Mårten Andersson
- L.E.G.A.C.Y., rapper and member of the Justus League
- Legacy (rapper) (born 1991), American rapper and producer, member of New Boyz

==== Albums ====
===== Compilation albums =====
- Legacy: A Collection of New Folk Music, released in 1989
- Legacy: The Absolute Best, an album by The Doors released in 2003
- Legacy: The Best of Mansun, released in 2006
- Legacy: The Greatest Hits Collection, an album by Boyz II Men released in 2001

===== Other albums =====
- Legacy (Akir album), 2006
- Legacy (Doc Watson album), 2002
- Legacy (Five Finger Death Punch album), 2026
- Legacy (Girlschool album), 2008
- Legacy (Jimmy D. Lane album), 2000
- Legacy (Lenny Breau album), 1983
- Legacy (Madball album), 2005
- Legacy (Myrath album), 2016
- Legacy, a 2010 album by Peter Rowan Bluegrass Band
- Legacy (Poco album), 1989
- Legacy (Ronnie Mathews album), 1979
- Legacy (Shadow Gallery album), 2001
- Legacy (The Flyin' Ryan Brothers album), 2002
- Legacy (The Temptations album), 2004
- Legacy (Upper Hutt Posse album), 2005
- Legacy: De Líder a Leyenda Tour (Yandel EP), 2014
- Legacy: De Líder a Leyenda Tour (Yandel album), 2015
- Legacy... Hymns and Faith, a 2002 album by Christian singer-songwriter Amy Grant
- Legacy (Planetshakers album), 2017
- Legacy (The Cadillac Three album) or the title song, 2017
- Legacy (Kyshona album), 2024
- Legacy, a 2025 album by West Coast collective Tunnel Rats

==== Songs ====
- "Legacy" (Mansun song), 1998
- "Legacy" (Nicky Romero and Krewella song), 2013
- "Legacy" (Eminem song), 2013
- "Legacy" (J. Cole and PJ song), 2026
- "Legacy", a song by As Blood Runs Black from Instinct
- "Legacy", a song by Black Veil Brides from Set the World on Fire
- "Legacy", a song by Brett Kissel from The Compass Project - West Album
- "Legacy", a song by Despised Icon from Purgatory
- "Legacy", a song by In This Moment from Mother
- "Legacy", a song by Jay Z from 4:44
- "Legacy", a song by Kutless from Hearts of the Innocent
- "Legacy", a song by Memphis May Fire from Challenger
- "Legacy", a song by Motionless in White from Disguise
- "Legacy", a song by NCT 127 from Blingy
- "Legacy", a song by Papa Roach from Infest
- "Legacy", a song by Paris Hilton from Infinite Icon
- "Legacy", a song by Phinehas from Thegodmachine
- "Legacy", a song by Unleash the Archers from Abyss
- "Legacy", a song by Your Memorial from Redirect

=== Television ===
==== Series ====
- Legacy (American TV series), a 1998–1999 western drama television series which aired on UPN
- Legacy (Philippine TV series), a 2012 dramatic television series
- Legacy (South African TV series), a 2020 South African television series
- Legacies (TV series), a 2018–2022 American television series and spinoff of The Originals that aired on The CW
- Star Trek: Legacy (TV series), a proposed 2020s TV series, a proposed spin-off of Star Trek: Picard

==== Episodes ====
- "Legacies" (Arrow), 2012
- "Legacy" (Arrow), 2016
- "Legacies" (Babylon 5), 1994
- "Legacy" (The Bear), 2024
- "Legacy" (CSI: Vegas), 2021
- "Legacies" (Dallas), 2013
- "Legacy" (The Flash), 2018
- "Legacy" (Law & Order: Criminal Intent), 2008
- "Legacy" (NCIS: New Orleans), 2018
- "Legacy" (Person of Interest), 2012
- "Legacy" (Stargate SG-1), 1999
- "Legacy" (Star Wars Rebels), 2015
- "Legacy" (Star Trek: The Next Generation), 1990
- "Legacy" (Wings), 1990

== Business ==
- Legacy Games, an interactive media company
- Legacy Releasing, a film distributor of the 1990s based in California
- Legacy Recordings, Sony BMG Music Entertainment's catalog division
- Legacy Village, an outdoor shopping complex in Lyndhurst, Ohio

== Places ==
- Legacy, Calgary, a residential neighbourhood in Alberta, Canada
- Legacy at Millennium Park, a skyscraper in Chicago, Illinois, US

== Sports ==
- San Francisco Legacy, the last original franchise of the National Women's Basketball League
- Virginia Legacy, an American soccer team
- Legacy Trust UK, a consortium associated with the London 2012 Olympic and Paralympic Games

== Technology ==
- Legacy system, an outdated computer system
- Fedora Legacy, an open-source project
- Legacy Family Tree, genealogy software
- Legacy.com, an online aggregator of obituaries and memorials

== Transportation ==
=== Air ===
- Legacy, a range of business jets:
  - Embraer Legacy 500 and Embraer Legacy 450
  - Embraer Legacy 600 and Embraer Legacy 650
- ABS Aerolight Legacy, a French powered parachute design
- Lancair Legacy, an American light aircraft design
- Legacy carrier, an older airline

=== Land ===
- Subaru Legacy, a mid-size car
- Legacy Parkway, a freeway in Utah, US
- Legacy railway station, a closed railway station near Ruabon, Wales
- Legacy SR, a body bus made from Laksana
- Legacy Way, a tunnel in Brisbane, Australia

== Other uses ==
- Legacy INS, another name for the US Immigration and Naturalization Service
- Legacy preferences, a preference for an applicant to an institution or organization to which a relative belonged
- Legacy Australia, a charitable institution
- Symbols for Legacy Computing, the block of symbols from various home computers
- Symbols for Legacy Computing Supplement, the supplement block from various home computers

== See also ==
- The Legacy (disambiguation)
