= Shake Your Pants (album) =

Compilation album by Cameo
- Released: January 15, 1992
- Label: Polygram
- Producer: Larry Blackmon

Cameo chronology
Emotional Violence (1991)	Shake Your Pants (1992)	The Best of Cameo (1993)

Professional ratings
Review scores
Source	Rating
Allmusic	2.5/5 stars

Shake Your Pants is the first compilation album by the funk group Cameo. Released in 1992, this out-of-print collection focuses on the band's earlier hits but passes over their more recent blockbusters. Some of the tracks had not been released as singles, making this collection unattractive to fans looking for a true hits collection. It was followed by The Best of Cameo in 1993.

== Track listing ==
1. "I Just Want to Be" (Blackmon, Gregory Johnson) - 6:18
2. "The Rock (Blackmon) - 3:56
3. "Macho" (Blackmon, Tomi Jenkins, Nathan Leftenant) - 5:03
4. "I'll Always Stay in Love" (Blackmon, Anthony Lockett) - 3:51
5. "Shake Your Pants" (Blackmon) - 4:23
6. "I Care for You" (Blackmon, Lockett) - 4:34
7. "Feel Me" (Blackmon, Lockett) - 5:01
8. "Keep It Hot" (Blackmon, Lockett) - 4:42
9. "Freaky Dancin'" (Blackmon, Jenkins) - 4:16
10. "Flirt" (Blackmon, Jenkins) - 4:06
11. "Just Be Yourself" (Blackmon, Jenkins, Charlie Singleton) - 4:03
12. "I Like It" (Blackmon, Lockett, Thomas "TC" Campbell, Aaron Mills) - 3:49
