= The Legacy =

The Legacy may refer to:

== Film ==
- The Legacy (1978 film), a horror film directed by Richard Marquand
- The Legacy (2009 film), a drama film from Canada directed by Bernard Émond

== Literature ==
- Le Legs or The Legacy, a 1736 play by Pierre de Marivaux
- The Legacy, an unpublished c. 1948 novel by Kingsley Amis
- The Legacy (Shute novel) (A Town Like Alice), a 1950 novel by Neville Shute
- The Legacy, a novelization of the 1978 film by John Coyne
- The Legacy, a 1981 novel by Howard Fast, the fourth installment in the Lavette Family series
- The Legacy, a 1987 novel by Lynda La Plante
- The Legacy (Forgotten Realms novel), a 1992 book by R. A. Salvatore
- The Legacy, a 1994 novel by Linda Lael Miller
- The Legacy, a 1997 novel by Claire Rayner
- The Legacy, a 1998 novel by Stephen Frey
- The Legacy, a 2010 novel by Kirsten Tranter, nominated for the Miles Franklin Award

== Music ==
- The Legacy (album), an album by Testament
- "The Legacy" (song), a 2011 song by Black Veil Brides
- The Legacy (1961–2002), a boxset covering four decades of recordings by Glen Campbell
- "The Legacy", a song by Testament on Souls of Black
- "The Legacy", a song by Iron Maiden on A Matter of Life and Death
- "The Legacy", a single by Push

== Television ==
=== Series ===
- The Legacy (TV series), a 2014–2017 Danish television drama

=== Episodes ===
- "The Legacy", 7th Heaven season 3, episode 4 (1998)
- "The Legacy", Alfred Hitchcock Presents season 1, episode 45 (1956)
- "The Legacy", Allegiance episode 7 (2024)
- "The Legacy", Arliss season 3, episode 6 (1998)
- "The Legacy", Ben Hall episode 11 (1975)
- "The Legacy", Black Harbour season 2, episode 4 (1997)
- "The Legacy", Bonanza season 5, episode 11 (1963)
- "The Legacy", Delta House episode 1 (1979)
- "The Legacy", Dr. Christian season 1, episode 13 (1956)
- "The Legacy", Dr. Kildare season 2, episode 11 (1962)
- "The Legacy", Harrigan and Son episode 31 (1961)
- "The Legacy", Have Gun – Will Travel season 4, episode 13 (1960)
- "The Legacy", Knots Landing season 7, episode 25 (1986)
- "The Legacy", Little House on the Prairie season 8, episode 14 (1982)
- "The Legacy", Los Americans episode 3 (2011)
- "The Legacy", Marcus Welby, M.D. season 1, episode 17 (1970)
- "The Legacy", Matlock season 7, episodes 3–4 (1992)
- "The Legacy", Mission: Impossible (1966) season 1, episode 15 (1967)
- "The Legacy", Mission: Impossible (1988) episode 5 (1988)
- "The Legacy", Monsters season 1, episode 7 (1988)
- "The Legacy", On the Rocks (American) episode 4 (1975)
- "The Legacy", Planet of the Apes episode 5 (1974)
- "The Legacy", Return to Lonesome Dove episode 3 (1993)
- "The Legacy", Stage 7 episode 3 (1955)
- "The Legacy", Tales of Wells Fargo season 3, episode 26 (1959)
- "The Legacy", The Campbells season 2, episode 22 (1989)
- "The Legacy", The Celts series 2, episode 6 (1987)
- "The Legacy", The Cheaters series 2, episode 6 (1961)
- "The Legacy", The Colbys season 2, episode 14 (1987)
- "The Legacy", The Dukes of Hazzard season 3, episode 13 (1981)
- "The Legacy", The High Chaparral season 3, episode 11 (1969)
- "The Legacy", The Immortal episode 4 (1970)
- "The Legacy", The Man from Blackhawk episode 12 (1959)
- "The Legacy", The Middle season 2, episode 19 (2011)
- "The Legacy", The Outsider episode 2 (1983)
- "The Legacy", The Real McCoys season 4, episode 20 (1960)
- "The Legacy", The Rebel season 2, episode 9 (1960)
- "The Legacy", The Waltons season 7, episode 20 (1979)
- "The Legacy", Versailles season 3, episode 10 (2018)
- "The Legacy", Whiplash episode 23 (1961)
- "The Legacy", Z-Cars series 7, episode 87 (1972)

=== Characters ===
- "The Legacy", a secret society of paranormal investigators on the TV show Poltergeist: The Legacy

== Other uses ==
- The Legacy (Lindenwood University), a college newspaper
- The Legacy (professional wrestling), a former professional wrestling faction in World Wrestling Entertainment
- The Legacy: Realm of Terror, a 1993 computer game

== See also ==
- Legacy (disambiguation)
