= We All Know Who We Are =

Studio album by Cameo
- Released: January 2, 1978
- Recorded: 1977
- Studio: Music Farm Studios, New York City; Hollywood Sound Recorders, Hollywood
- Length: 34:40
- Label: Chocolate City
- Producer: Larry Blackmon

Cameo chronology
Cardiac Arrest (1977)	We All Know Who We Are (1978)	Ugly Ego (1978)

Professional ratings
Review scores
Source	Rating
AllMusic	3/5 stars

We All Know Who We Are is the second studio album by American funk band Cameo, released in January 1978.

== Track listing ==
All tracks composed by Larry Blackmon, except where noted

1. "Inflation" – 4:40
2. "C On the Funk" – 4:25
3. "Why Have I Lost You" – 4:45
4. "Stand Up" – 3:34 (Blackmon, Eric Durham)
5. "We All Know Who We Are" – 4:52 (Blackmon, Tomi Jenkins)
6. "It's Serious" – 8:06 (Blackmon, Greg "Doc" Johnson)
7. "It's Over" – 4:17 (Blackmon, Tomi Jenkins, Nathan Leftenant)

== Personnel ==
- Larry Blackmon – lead vocals, drums, percussion
- Gregory Johnson – keyboards, piano, vocals
- Gary Dow – bass guitar
- Eric Durham – guitar
- Arnett Leftenant – saxophone, percussion
- Nathan Leftenant – trumpet, percussion
- Wayne Cooper – vocals, percussion
- Tomi Jenkins – vocals
- Charles Sampson – guitar

== Charts ==
Chart (1978)	Peak position
US Billboard 200	58
US Top R&B/Hip-Hop Albums (Billboard)	15

=== Singles ===
Title	Year	Peak chart positions	
Title	Year	US R&B	US Dance
"It's Serious"	1978	21	29
"It's Over"	1978	60	—
