= Ugly Ego =

Studio album by Cameo
- Released: September 25, 1978
- Recorded: 1977–1978
- Studio: Music Farm Studios, New York City; Burbank Studios, Burbank, California
- Label: Chocolate City
- Producer: Larry Blackmon

Cameo chronology
We All Know Who We Are (1978)	Ugly Ego (1978)	Secret Omen (1979)

Professional ratings
Review scores
Source	Rating
AllMusic	4/5 stars

Ugly Ego is the third studio album by American funk band Cameo, released in September 1978.

== Track listing ==
All tracks composed by Larry Blackmon, except where noted

1. "I'll Be with You" – 4:23
2. "Insane" – 5:01
3. "Give Love a Chance" – 4:50 (lyrics: Blackmon; music: Anthony Lockett)
4. "I Want You" – 4:09
5. "Ugly Ego" – 4:53 (Blackmon, lyrics: Tomi Jenkins)
6. "Anything You Wanna Do" – 3:32 (Blackmon, music: Eric Durham)
7. "Friend to Me" – 5:13 (Blackmon, lyrics: Zelda Black)
8. "Two of Us" – 4:32

== Personnel ==
- Larry Blackmon – lead vocals, drums, percussion
- Gregory Johnson – keyboards, piano, vocals
- Gary Dow – bass guitar
- Anthony Lockett – guitar, vocals
- Eric Durham – guitar
- Arnett Leftenant – saxophone
- Nathan Leftenant – trumpet
- Tomi Jenkins, Wayne Cooper – vocals

== Charts ==
Chart (1978)	Peak position
US Billboard 200	86
US Top R&B/Hip-Hop Albums (Billboard)	16

=== Singles ===
Title	Year	Peak chart positions
Title	Year	US R&B
"Give Love a Chance"	1979	76
"Insane"	1979	17
