= Cameosis =

Studio album by Cameo
- Released: April 24, 1980
- Recorded: 1979–1980
- Studio: H&L Studios (Englewood Cliffs, New Jersey)
- Length: 33:32
- Label: Chocolate City
- Producer: Larry Blackmon

Cameo chronology
Secret Omen (1979)	Cameosis (1980)	Feel Me (1980)

Professional ratings
Review scores
Source	Rating
AllMusic	4/5 stars
Christgau's Record Guide: The '80s	C

Cameosis is the fifth studio album by American funk band Cameo, released in April 1980.

== Reception ==
Cameosis reached number one on the R&B album charts and number twenty five on the Billboard 200 album charts. It was certified gold for sales of more than 500,000 copies in the US. The two singles, "We're Goin' Out Tonight" and "Shake Your Pants", charted on the R&B singles charts at number 11 and 8 respectively. However, "Shake Your Pants" received considerable radio play as an album track, and was already a bonafide hit prior to being released as a single. The album's closing track, "Why Have I Lost You", was a new version of the same song that had been released on the band's second album. This re-recorded rendition also received considerable airplay, and has remained a staple of the late night "quiet storm" format at urban adult contemporary radio.

== Track listing ==
1. "Cameosis" – (Larry Blackmon, Aaron Mills) 4:09
2. "Shake Your Pants" – (Larry Blackmon) 6:21
3. "Please You" – (Larry Blackmon, Gregory Johnson) 4:15
4. "We're Goin' Out Tonight" – (Larry Blackmon, Nathan Leftenant, Tomi Jenkins) 4:40
5. "I Care for You" – (Larry Blackmon, Anthony Lockett) 4:34
6. "On the One" – (Larry Blackmon, Anthony Lockett, Tomi Jenkins) 4:59
7. "Why Have I Lost You" – (Larry Blackmon) 4:34

== Personnel ==
=== Cameo ===
- Larry Blackmon – lead vocals, drums, percussion
- Gregory Johnson – keyboards, Fender Rhodes, vocals
- Aaron Mills – bass guitar, vocals
- Thomas 'T.C.' Campbell – piano, Fender Rhodes, Moog synthesizer
- Anthony Lockett – guitar, vocals
- Arnett Leftenant – saxophone, vocals
- Nathan Leftenant – trumpet, vocals
- Jeryl Bright – trombone
- Tomi Jenkins, Wayne Cooper – vocals

=== Additional musicians ===
- Arthur Young – trumpet
- Angel Allende – congas

== Charts ==
=== Weekly charts ===
Chart (1980)	Peak position
US Billboard 200	25
US Top R&B/Hip-Hop Albums (Billboard)	1

=== Year-end charts ===
Chart (1980)	Position
US Billboard 200	100
US Top R&B/Hip-Hop Albums (Billboard)	17

=== Singles ===
Title	Year	Peak chart positions	
Title	Year	US R&B	US Dance
"We're Goin' Out Tonight"	1980	11	—
"Shake Your Pants"	1980	8	—
