= Single Life =

Studio album by Cameo
- Released: June 17, 1985
- Recorded: 1984–1985
- Studios: Quadrasonic Studio (New York, NY)
- Genres: Funk, rap, reggae
- Length: 34:08
- Label: Atlanta Artists/Mercury/PolyGram
- Producer: Larry Blackmon

Cameo chronology
She's Strange (1984)	Single Life (1985)	Word Up! (1986)

Singles from Single Life
- 1. "Attack Me with Your Love" Released: February 15, 1985; 2. "Single Life" Released: 1985; 3. "A Good-Bye" Released: 1985

Professional ratings
Review scores
Source	Rating
Allmusic	4/5 stars

Single Life is a 1985 album by the funk group Cameo. The album reached No. 2 on the Top R&B/Hip-Hop Albums chart and No. 58 on the Billboard Pop Albums chart. It contained the hit singles "Attack Me With Your Love", which reached No. 3 R&B, and the title track, "Single Life", which reached No. 2 R&B (it also reached No. 15 in the UK charts). "Urban Warrior" was the group's foray into the emerging Hip-hop scene. The videos for both singles included appearances from popular television soap opera actors and were tied together by a particular storyline; with the title track's video being a continuation of the story that started in the "Attack Me With Your Love" video. The album was Cameo's seventh to be certified Gold by the RIAA for sales of over 500,000 copies.

== Track listing ==
No.	Title	Writer(s)	Length
1.	"Attack Me With Your Love"	L. Blackmon, Kendrick	4:30
2.	"Single Life"	L. Blackmon, Jenkins	6:30
3.	"I've Got Your Image"	L. Blackmon, Kendrick	4:45
4.	"A Good-Bye"	L. Blackmon, Leftenant	5:40
5.	"I'll Never Look for Love"	L. Blackmon, Kendrick	4:53
6.	"Urban Warrior"	L. Blackmon, Leftenant, Bruno Blackmon	4:55
7.	"Little Boys – Dangerous Toys"	L. Blackmon, Leftenant	4:55

== Personnel ==
Cameo

- Larry Blackmon – lead vocals, backing vocals, bass guitar, drums, percussion, arrangements, horn arrangements
- Tomi Jenkins – lead vocals, backing vocals
- Nathan Leftenant – backing vocals, horn arrangements

Additional musicians

- Kevin Kendrick – keyboards, synthesizers, bass guitar
- Eric Rehl – keyboards, synthesizers
- Pat Buchanan – guitars
- Charlie Singleton – guitars, backing vocals
- Fred Wells – guitars
- Michael Burnett – bass guitar, backing vocals
- Barry Johnson – bass guitar
- Sammy Merendino – drum programming
- Roy Leftenant – timbales
- Melvin Wells – alto saxophone
- Keith O'Quinn – trombone
- John Gatchell – trumpet
- Dennis Williams – arrangements
- Barbara Mitchell – lead and additional vocals (5)

=== Production ===
- Larry Blackmon – producer, mixing, cover concept
- Dave Ogrin – engineer, mixing
- José Rodriguez – mastering at Sterling Sound (New York, NY)
- Bill Levy – art direction
- George Corsillo – design
- Anthony Barboza – photography
- Kenneth Cole – wardrobe
- Christian Kenth – wardrobe
- Leonett – stylist
- Ronald Grant – stylist
- Tony Marshall – hair
- Claleoa Williams – make-up
- Atlanta Artists Management – management

== Charts and certifications ==
=== Weekly charts ===
Chart (1985)	Peak position
UK Albums (Official Charts)	66
US Billboard 200	58
US Top R&B/Hip-Hop Albums (Billboard)	2

=== Year-end charts ===
Chart (1985)	Position
US Top R&B/Hip-Hop Albums (Billboard)	26

=== Certifications ===
Region	Certification	Certified units/sales
United States (RIAA)	Gold	500,000^{^}
^{^} Shipments figures based on certification alone.

== Singles ==
- "Attack Me With Your Love" - released February 15, 1985
- "Single Life" - released June 7, 1985
- " A Good-Bye" - released Dec. 1985
