= Jimmy D. Lane =

American guitarist (born 1965)

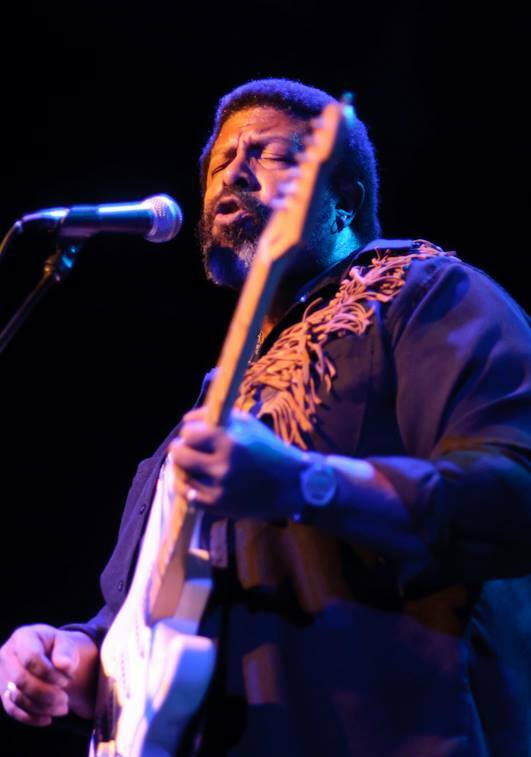

Background information
- Born: Jimmy D. Lane; July 4, 1965 (age 60); Chicago, Illinois, United States
- Genres: Electric blues
- Occupation: Guitarist
- Instruments: Vocals, guitar, bass, drums
- Years active: 1990s–present
- Label: APO Records

Jimmy D. Lane (born July 4, 1965, in Chicago, Illinois, United States) is an American electric blues guitarist.

Lane was born to the Chess blues musician Jimmy Rogers and his wife Dorothy. In his childhood, he got to know a number of older bluesmen who worked with his father, including Muddy Waters, Howlin' Wolf, Willie Mabon, Little Walter and Albert King. In 1998, Lane played for the then President Bill Clinton.

== Career ==
He has worked with Eric Clapton, Mick Jagger, Jim Keltner, Keith Richards, B.B. King, Van Morrison, Jonny Lang, Gary Moore, Double Trouble, Taj Mahal, Stephen Stills, Jeff Healey, Lowell Fulson, and Snooky Pryor, Kim Wilson, Pinetop Perkins, Johnnie Johnson, Kim Wilson, Robert Plant, Jimmy Page, David ‘HoneyBoy’ Edwards, Little Hatch, Willie Kent, Henry Gray, Lazy Lester and Eomot RaSun. He has also worked with Sam Lay, Hubert Sumlin, Carey Bell, Dave Myers and his father, Jimmy Rogers.

In 1993, The Jimmy Rogers Band toured Europe, where they made a stop to perform at the BBC. In 1994 they performed at the W. C. Handy Awards and in 1995 they appeared on the Conan O'Brien Show, as well as the Chicago Blues Festival.

He made his solo recording debut in 1995. The self-titled disc on Blue Seal Records featured 12 originals and one of his father's tunes. In 1993, during the sessions for Bluebird for Analogue Productions, with the Jimmy Rogers Band, he met the record producer John Koenig and head of Acoustic Sounds, Chad Kassem. Koenig saw the Jimmy D. Lane band at B. B. King's Club in Universal City. Koenig and Kassem got together and Lane recorded Long Gone for Analogue Productions in 1995, at Ocean Way Studios in Los Angeles.

His second album, Long Gone was released in 1997. Lane played on and co-produced Hubert Sumlin's I Know You, also on Analogue Productions.

One of his favorite phrases "It's all good", was originally the title of his third release, but changed it to Legacy in honor of his father's memory. It was released in May 1998, and featured guest appearances of Sam Lay on drums, Carey Bell on harp and Hubert Sumlin on guitar. It also featured the last recordings of Jimmy Rogers, who played on "One Room Country Shack" and "Another Mule Kickin' In My Stall."

Lane's fourth release was It's Time. Eddie Kramer (audio engineer), Chris "Whipper" Layton, Tommy Shannon and Mike Finnigan participated.

In 2008, Lane's song "Tears Without A Shoulder" was featured in an episode of In Plain Sight ("The Trojan Horst"). In July 2012, Lane made a national Canadian television appearance on Global BC Morning News. He was commissioned by Tourism Burnaby, British Columbia to host an on line Twitter video show, "Tweet The Blues", to help promote the 2012 Burnaby Blues Festival. He has been included on his father's, Mississippi Blues Trail Historical Landmark in Ruleville, Mississippi. Lane performed two songs on the Experience Hendrix Live at The Paramount Theatre DVD, released in 2008. He performed with Mike McCready, Double Trouble and Hubert Sumlin, on the project.

In April 2013, Lane was inducted into the Chicago Blues Hall Of Fame.

== Musical style ==
Lane's music has been likened to that of Stevie Ray Vaughan, whose former band Double Trouble played with him on the 2004 album, It's Time. Others have compared Lane's guitar work with that of Corey Stevens, Kenny Wayne Shepherd, Jonny Lang, Jimi Hendrix and Jeff Healey.

== Discography ==
=== Albums ===
- Long Gone (1997, APO Records) - featuring Jim Keltner on drums
- Legacy (1998, APO Records) - guest appearances by Jimmy Rogers, Hubert Sumlin, Sam Lay and Carey Bell
- It's Time (2004, APO Records) - billed as Jimmy D. Lane and Double Trouble, and produced by Eddie Kramer
- Rings (2010, LB Records) - billed as Jimmy D. Lane and Beverly Butler'Lane

=== Guest appearances ===
- Jimmy Rogers All Stars - Blues, Blues, Blues (1999, Atlantic) with Eric Clapton, Taj Mahal, Lowell Fulsom, Mick Jagger, Keith Richards, Jimmy Page, Robert Plant, Jeff Healey, Stephen Stills
- Jimmy Rogers - Blue Bird (APO Records)
- Jimmy Rogers - Jimmy Rogers / Johnny "Big Moose" Walker (Wolf Records)
- Blues Masters At The Crossroads (APO Records) 1998–2002 (on 24/96 DVD)
- Jimmie Lee Robinson - All My Life (APO Records)
- Jimmie Lee Robinson - Remember Me (APO Records)
- Little Hatch - Rock With Me Baby (APO Records)
- Nancy Bryan - Neon Angel (APO Records)
- George "Wild Child" Butler (APO Records) - D2D
- Harry "Big Daddy" Hypolite - Louisiana Country Boy (APO Records)
- Eomot RaSun - Three Days Walkin' (APO Records)
- Weepin' Willie - At Last On Time (APO Records)
- David "Honeyboy" Edwards - Shake 'Em On Down (APO Records)
- George "Wild Child" Butler - Sho' 'Nuff (APO Records)
- Henry Gray (APO Records) - D2D
- Hubert Sumlin - I Know You (APO Records)
- Pinetop Perkins - Pinetop Perkins (APO Records) - D2D
- Henry Townsend - My Story (APO Records)
- Lazy Lester - Lazy Lester (APO Records) – D2D
- B.B. King in Montreux, Switzerland (1999)
- Ralph Bassinger - Waiting For My Train (2007)
- Experience Hendrix Live at The Paramount Theatre - (2008, DVD)

Note: (D2D = Direct to Disc. Recorded directly onto a vinyl disc)
