= Cardiac Arrest (album) =

Studio album by Cameo
- Released: January 1977
- Recorded: 1975–1976
- Studios: Music Farm Studios, New York City
- Genre: Funk
- Length: 35:33
- Label: Chocolate City
- Producer: Larry Blackmon

Cameo chronology
| Cardiac Arrest (1977) | We All Know Who We Are (1978) |

Professional ratings
Review scores
| Source | Rating |
|---|---|
| AllMusic | 4.5/5 stars |
| The Encyclopedia of Popular Music | 2/5 stars |
| The New Rolling Stone Album Guide | 3/5 stars |

Cardiac Arrest is the debut album by American funk band Cameo.

The album reached number 16 on the R&B charts. It contains the hit singles "Rigor Mortis" and "Funk Funk".

== Critical reception ==
Rickey Vincent, in Funk: The Music, The People, and The Rhythm of The One, deemed the album an "exquisite [example] of the fertile, erotic realm of R&B-based funk at its most stretched out."

== Track listing ==
All tracks are written by Larry Blackmon, except where noted.

Side one
| No. | Title | Writer(s) | Length |
|---|---|---|---|
| 1. | "Still Feels Good" | | 4:14 |
| 2. | "Post Mortem" | Larry Blackmon, Gregory Johnson | 4:17 |
| 3. | "Smile" | | 3:48 |
| 4. | "Funk Funk" | | 4:44 |

Side two
| No. | Title | Writer(s) | Length |
|---|---|---|---|
| 5. | "Find My Way" | Johnny Melfi | 3:23 |
| 6. | "Rigor Mortis" | Larry Blackmon, Nathan Leftenant, Arnett Leftenant | 5:18 |
| 7. | "Good Times" | | 4:59 |
| 8. | "Stay by My Side" | | 4:23 |

== Personnel ==
- Larry Blackmon – lead vocals, drums, percussion
- Gregory Johnson – keyboards, piano, vocals
- William Revis – bass guitar
- Eric Durham – guitar
- Arnett Leftenant – saxophone
- Nathan Leftenant – trumpet
- Tomi Jenkins, Kurt Jetter – vocals

== Charts ==
| Chart (1977) | Peak position |
|---|---|
| US Billboard 200 | 116 |
| US Top R&B/Hip-Hop Albums (Billboard) | 16 |

=== Singles ===
| Title | Year | Peak chart positions | |
| Title | Year | US R&B | US Dance |
|---|---|---|---|
| "Find My Way" | 1976 | — | 3 |
| "Rigor Mortis" | 1977 | 33 | — |
| "Post Mortem" | 1977 | 70 | — |
| "Funk Funk" | 1977 | 20 | — |
