= Secret Omen =

Studio album by Cameo
- Released: June 25, 1979
- Recorded: 1978–1979
- Studio: H&L Studios, Englewood Cliffs, New Jersey
- Genre: Funk
- Length: 37:41
- Label: Chocolate City
- Producer: Larry Blackmon

Cameo chronology
Ugly Ego (1978)	Secret Omen (1979)	Cameosis (1980)

Professional ratings
Review scores
Source	Rating
AllMusic	4.5/5 stars
The Virgin Encyclopedia of R&B and Soul	2/5 stars

Secret Omen is the fourth studio album by American funk band Cameo, released in June 1979. It was their first of nine albums, and the first of five consecutive albums to be certified gold in the US for sales of over 500,000 copies.

== Track listing ==
1. "Energy" – 4:21 (Larry Blackmon)
2. "I Just Want to Be" – 5:16 (Larry Blackmon, Gregory Johnson)
3. "Find My Way" – 9:18 (Johnny Melfi)
4. "Macho" – 5:04 (Larry Blackmon, Tomi Jenkins, Nathan Leftenant)
5. "The Rock" – 3:56 (Larry Blackmon)
6. "Sparkle" – 4:49 (Larry Blackmon, Anthony Lockett)
7. "New York" – 4:57 (Larry Blackmon, Anthony Lockett, Aaron Mills)

== Personnel ==
- Larry Blackmon – lead vocals, drums, percussion
- Gregory Johnson – keyboards, piano, vocals
- Aaron Mills – bass guitar, percussion, backing vocals
- Damon Mendes – percussion
- Anthony Lockett – lead guitar, rhythm guitar, percussion, lead vocals, backing vocals
- Fred Wells – guitar
- Randy Stern – keyboards
- Arnett Leftenant – tenor saxophone, percussion, backing vocals
- Nathan Leftenant, Arthur Young – trumpet
- Carl Harleston – trombone
- Seldon Powell, George Marge – flute
- Angel Allende – conga
- Tomi Jenkins, Wayne Cooper – vocals
- Irving Spice's Strings – strings

== Charts ==
Chart (1979)	Peak position
US Billboard 200	46
US Top R&B/Hip-Hop Albums (Billboard)	4

=== Singles ===
Title	Year	Peak chart positions	
Title	Year	US R&B	US Dance
"I Just Want to Be"	1979	3	52
"Sparkle"	1980	10	—
