= Vernon Burch =

American singer and guitarist (1955–2022)

- Born: Vernon Darrell Burch; July 28, 1955; Washington, D.C., United States
- Died: September 21, 2022 (aged 67)
- Genres: Soul, funk, R&B
- Occupations: Musician, minister
- Years active: 1971–2000, 2011
- Labels: United Artists, Columbia, Chocolate City
- Formerly of: Bar-Kays

Vernon Darrell Burch (July 28, 1955 – September 21, 2022) was an American R&B/soul singer and guitarist.

== Biography ==
In 1975, Burch signed to United Artists, where he released his first album, I'll Be Your Sunshine. Later, he moved to Columbia Records and then Chocolate City Records, which was distributed by Casablanca Records and Filmworks. He later recorded for Spector.

Two of his singles, "Changes (Messin' with My Mind)" in 1975 and "Do It to Me" in 1981, made it into the Billboard R&B top 20 chart. Burch's other singles include "Brighter Days", "Steppin' Out", "Love Is", "Never Can Find a Way (Hot Love)", "Once Again in My Life", "Get Up" and "Fun City".

His song "Get Up" was made famous by being sampled by the 1990s pop group Deee-Lite, with their biggest hit "Groove is in the Heart".

== Death ==
Burch died on September 21, 2022. His death was announced on Twitter two days later by former Supremes member Susaye Greene. He was 67 years old.

== Discography ==
=== Studio albums ===
- I'll Be Your Sunshine (1975)
- When I Get Back Home (1977)
- Love-A-Thon (1978)
- Get Up (1979)
- Stepping Out (1980)
- Playing Hard to Get (1982)

== Sources ==
- Allmusic entry
