= The Best of Cameo (1993 album) =

Greatest hits album by Cameo
- Released: May 18, 1993
- Length: 72:30
- Label: Mercury
- Producer: Larry Blackmon

Cameo chronology
Shake Your Pants (1992)	The Best of Cameo (1993)	In the Face of Funk (1994)

Professional ratings
Review scores
Source	Rating
AllMusic	4/5 stars
Christgau's Consumer Guide	(1-star Honorable Mention)
The New Rolling Stone Album Guide	4/5 stars

The Best of Cameo is a greatest hits album by the funk group Cameo, released in 1993. In total, nine albums are represented by 14 tracks. The Best of Cameo, Volume 2 was released three years later.

== Track listing ==
1. "Word Up!" – 4:19 - Blackmon/Jenkins
2. "Single Life – 6:35 - Blackmon/Jenkins
3. "Candy" – 5:39 - Blackmon/Jenkins
4. "Shake Your Pants" – 6:21 - Blackmon
5. "Rigor Mortis" – 5:21 - Blackmon/Leftenant/Leftenant
6. "Attack Me With Your Love" – 4:30 - Blackmon/Kendrick
7. "Talkin' Out the Side of Your Neck" – 4:05 - Blackmon/Jenkins/Leftenant/Singleton
8. "Sparkle" – 4:51 - Blackmon/Lockett
9. "Back and Forth" – 3:52 - Blackmon/Jenkins/Kendrick/Leftenant
10. "Flirt" – 4:06 - Blackmon/Jenkins
11. "She's Strange" – 6:52 (12" rap version) - Blackmon/Jenkins/Leftenant/Singleton
12. "I Just Want to Be" – 5:18 - Blackmon/Johnson
13. "Skin I'm In" – 6:25 - Blackmon
14. "It's Over" – 4:16 - Blackmon/Jenkins/Leftenant

== Charts ==
- Top R&B/Hip-Hop Albums - #44

== See also ==
- The Best of Cameo, Volume 2
- Best of Cameo
- The Best of Cameo
