= It's Time (Jimmy D. Lane album) =

Studio album by Jimmy D. Lane
- Released: 2004
- Recorded: 2001
- Studio: Blue Heaven Studios, Salina, Kansas
- Genre: Blues
- Label: Analogue Productions
- Producer: Eddie Kramer

Jimmy D. Lane chronology
Legacy (1998)	It's Time (2004)

Professional ratings
Review scores
Source	Rating
AllMusic	4/5 stars

It's Time is a blues album released in 2004 by Jimmy D. Lane. It was described by reviewers as "an excellent place" to seek inspiration for "any fan of serious blues guitar". The album was recorded with Double Trouble, the former bandmates of Stevie Ray Vaughan, whose musical style it emulates. Celia Ann Price and Mike Finnegan play the keyboards.

== Track listing ==
1. "What Makes People"
2. "'Til I Loved You"
3. "Half Love"
4. "Ain't It a Pity"
5. "It's Time"
6. "Stuck in the Middle"
7. "Hand on the Door"
8. "Bad Luck"
9. "My Nature"
10. "24-7"
11. "Bleeding Heart" - (Jimmy D. Lane, Elmore James)
12. "Salina"
