= Machismo (album) =

Studio album by Cameo
- Released: October 17, 1988
- Recorded: 1987–1988
- Studio: The Hit Factory and Quad Recording Studios (New York City, New York); Limelite Studios (Miami, Florida)
- Genre: Funk
- Length: 44:56
- Label: Atlanta Artists
- Producer: Larry Blackmon

Cameo chronology
Word Up! (1986)	Machismo (1988)	Real Men... Wear Black (1990)

Machismo is the funk group Cameo's 1988 follow up to their album Word Up!. It includes the hits "You Make Me Work" and "Skin I'm In". The album reached No. 10 on the Billboard R&B chart, No. 56 on the Billboard 200 Pop Albums chart, and No. 86 on the UK albums chart. It was certified Gold by the RIAA for sales of over 500,000 copies.

== Critical reception ==
Professional ratings
Review scores
Source	Rating
Allmusic	3/5 stars
Los Angeles Times	3/4 stars
Chicago Tribune	(favourable)

Chris Heim of the Chicago Tribune placed Machismo at No. 6 on his list of the top 10 albums of 1988.

== Track listing ==
1. "You Make Me Work" (Larry Blackmon) – 6:08
2. "I Like the World" (Blackmon, Simeo Overall) – 6:14
3. "Promiscuous" (Blackmon, Nathan Leftenant) – 4:33
4. "In the Night" featuring Miles Davis (Blackmon, Merv De Peyer) – 4:43
5. "Skin I'm In" (Blackmon) – 6:25
6. "Pretty Girls" (Blackmon, Gregory Magnus) – 4:59
7. "Honey" (Blackmon, Tomi Jenkins) – 2:07
8. "Soul Tightened" (Blackmon, Jenkins) – 4:39
9. "DKWIG" (Blackmon, Jenkins, Leftenant) – 4:37

== Personnel ==
Cameo

- Larry Blackmon – lead vocals, backing vocals, bass guitar, drums, percussion
- Tomi Jenkins – lead vocals, backing vocals
- Nathan Leftenant – backing vocals

Additional musicians

- Merv De Peyer – keyboards, drum programming
- Kevin Kendricks – keyboards
- Eric Rehl – keyboards
- Randy Stern – keyboards
- Bernard Wright – keyboards
- Jean Beauvoir – guitars
- Mike Dino Campbell – guitars
- Charlie Singleton – guitars, backing vocals
- Little Steven – guitars
- Lenny Williams – guitars
- Kenni Burke – bass guitar
- Michael Burnett – bass guitar, backing vocals
- Aaron Mills – bass guitar
- Sammy Merendino – drum programming
- Kenny Garrett – alto saxophone
- Maceo Parker – alto saxophone
- Michael Brecker – tenor saxophone
- Arnett Leftenant – tenor saxophone
- Dave Tofani – tenor saxophone
- Fred Wesley – trombone
- Randy Brecker – trumpet
- Alan Rubin – trumpet
- Miles Davis – trumpet solos (4)
- Willie Morris – backing vocals

Uptown Horns

- Crispin Cioe – alto saxophone, baritone saxophone
- Arno Hecht – tenor saxophone
- Bob Funk – trombone
- Paul Litteral – trumpet

== Production ==
- Larry Blackmon – producer
- Mark Cobrin – recording
- Alan Meyerson – recording
- Dave Ogrin – mixing
- Keith Seppenen – recording, mixing
- Craig Vogel – recording, mixing
- Scott Forman – assistant engineer
- Robert Smith – assistant engineer
- Andrew Spiegelman – assistant engineer
- Rich Travali – assistant engineer
- José Rodriguez – mastering at Sterling Sound (New York, NY)
- Reiner Design Consultants, Inc. – design
- Drew Carolan – photography
- Toyce Anderson – stylist
- Roxanne Floyd – hair, make-up
- Anderson Phillips – hair, make-up
- Jean Paul Gaultier – clothes
- Q Prime, Inc. – management

== Chart positions ==
Year	Chart	Peak position
1988	US Billboard Top Soul Albums	10
1988	US Billboard 200	56
1988	UK Pop Albums	83

== Singles ==
- "You Make Me Work" – released September 1988
- "Skin I'm In" – released December 1988
- "Pretty Girls" – released May 1989
