= Alligator Woman =

Studio album by Cameo
- Released: March 22, 1982
- Recorded: 1981
- Studios: Cheshire Sound Studios (Atlanta, Georgia)
- Genre: Funk
- Length: 30:12
- Label: Chocolate City
- Producer: Larry Blackmon

Cameo chronology
Knights of the Sound Table (1981)	Alligator Woman (1982)	Style (1983)

Singles from Alligator Woman
- 1. "Flirt" Released: February 6, 1982; 2. "Alligator Woman" Released: March 10, 1982

Professional ratings
Review scores
Source	Rating
AllMusic	3/5 stars
The Village Voice	B

Alligator Woman is a 1982 album by the American funk band Cameo, released by Casablanca Records. It is the group's eighth studio album, and the first released after group leader Larry Blackmon reduced the band from 11 members to 5: himself, Tomi Jenkins, Nathan Leftenant, Charlie Singleton, and Gregory Johnson (who would leave the band prior to their next album). Alligator Woman combined Cameo's traditional funk with elements of rock and new wave, and was the band's fifth consecutive album to be certified Gold by the RIAA for sales of over 500,000 copies. The cover artwork model is the Canadian singer/model Denise Matthews, previously known as Vanity.

== Track listing ==
Side one
No.	Title	Writer(s)	Length
1.	"Be Yourself"	Charlie Singleton, Larry Blackmon, Tomi Jenkins	4:06
2.	"Soul Army"	Larry Blackmon, Tomi Jenkins	4:13
3.	"Flirt"	Larry Blackmon, Tomi Jenkins	4:15
4.	"Enjoy Your Life"	Larry Blackmon	4:33
Total length:			17:07

Side two
No.	Title	Writer(s)	Length
5.	"Alligator Woman"	Larry Blackmon, Tomi Jenkins, Charlie Singleton	3:42
6.	"Secrets of Time"	Tomi Jenkins, Larry Blackmon, Charlie Singleton	2:52
7.	"I Owe It All to You"	Larry Blackmon	2:52
8.	"For You"	Charlie Singleton	3:39
Total length:			13:05

== Personnel ==
Cameo

- Larry Blackmon – lead and backing vocals, drums, percussion
- Tomi Jenkins – lead and backing vocals
- Gregory B. Johnson – Fender Rhodes, Moog synthesizer, bells, backing vocals
- Charlie Singleton – lead and backing vocals, keyboards, lead guitars
- Nathan Leftenant – trumpet, backing vocals, horn arrangements

Additional musicians

- Kevin Kendricks – Fender Rhodes, Minimoog, Prophet-5, Roland Jupiter-8
- Randy Stern – Yamaha CS-80
- Michael Burnett – bass guitar
- Webster Jackson – saxophones
- Lloyd Oby – trombone, backing vocals
- Stacey Cole – trumpet
- Walter Perry – trumpet
- Tina Jackson – backing vocals
- Anita Robinson – backing vocals
- Vickie Smith – backing vocals
- Sheila Weaver – backing vocals

=== Production ===
- Larry Blackmon – producer, mixing
- Tom Race – engineer, mixing
- Jack Skinner – mastering at Sterling Sound (New York, NY)
- Bob Heimall – art direction
- Bill Levy – art direction
- Mo Ström – design
- Anthony Barboza – photography

== Charts ==
=== Weekly charts ===
Chart (1982)	Peak position
US Billboard 200	23
US Top R&B/Hip-Hop Albums (Billboard)	6

=== Year-end charts ===
Chart (1982)	Position
US Top R&B/Hip-Hop Albums (Billboard)	29
