= Legacy (Jimmy D. Lane album) =

Studio album by Jimmy D. Lane
- Released: 1998, re-released 2000
- Recorded: October 1997
- Genre: Blues
- Label: Analogue

Jimmy D. Lane chronology
Long Gone (1997)	Legacy (1998)	It's Time (2004)

Professional ratings
Review scores
Source	Rating
Allmusic	4/5 stars
The Penguin Guide to Blues Recordings	3/4 stars

Legacy is a blues album released in 1998 by Jimmy D. Lane.

== Track listing ==
1. "Hey Little Girl"
2. "Clue Me"
3. "Four O'Clock in the Morning"
4. "Going Downtown"
5. "Another Mule Kickin' in My Stall"
6. "In This Bed"
7. "Call It Blues"
8. "One Room Country Shack" (Mercy Dee Walton)
9. "Big House"
10. "Baby's Mule"
11. "Dem Blues"
12. "Pride"
13. "It's All Good"
