= Best of Cameo =

Greatest hits album by Cameo
- Released: April 8, 1998
- Label: Universal
- Producer: Larry Blackmon

Cameo chronology
Nasty (1996)	Best of Cameo (1998)	Live: Word Up (1998)

Professional ratings
Review scores
Source	Rating
Allmusic	link

Best of Cameo is a compilation album released by the funk group Cameo in 1998. It is not to be confused with 1993 release, The Best of Cameo. The band's biggest hits are not included in this 11-track release. This title was re-released under the Collectables Records label on November 23, 2004, under the slightly different title, The Best of Cameo.

== Track listing ==
1. "She's Strange" – 3:48 - Blackmon, Jenkins, Leftenant, Singleton
2. "I Just Want to Be" – 5:20 - Blackmon, Johnson
3. "Shake Your Pants" – 4:22 - Blackmon
4. "I'll Always Stay" – 3:54 - Blackmon, Lockett
5. "Flirt" – 4:09 - Blackmon, Jenkins
6. "I Like It" – 4:14 - Blackmon, Campbell, Lockett, Mills
7. "Be Yourself" – 4:36 - Blackmon, Jenkins
8. "I Care for You" – 4:10 - Blackmon, Jenkins, Singleton
9. "Feel Me" – 5:06 - Blackmon, Lockett
10. "Keep It Hot" – 5:12 - Blackmon, Lockett
11. "The Rock" – 3:54 - Blackmon
