= Real Men... Wear Black =

Studio album by Cameo
- Released: June 11, 1990
- Recorded: 1989–1990
- Studio: Bazooka Studios (Miami, Florida); Encore Studios (Burbank, California)
- Genre: Funk; black rock
- Length: 40:35
- Label: Atlanta Artists/Polygram Records
- Producer: Larry Blackmon

Cameo chronology
Machismo (1988)	Real Men... Wear Black (1990)	Emotional Violence (1991)

Real Men... Wear Black is a studio album by the funk group Cameo released in 1990 on Atlanta Artists/Mercury Records. The album reached No. 18 on the Billboard Top Soul Albums chart.

== Critical reception ==
Professional ratings
Review scores
Source	Rating
AllMusic	3/5 stars
Los Angeles Times	3/5 stars
Chicago Tribune	3/5 stars
New York Times	(favourable)
USA Today	(favourable)
Rolling Stone	3/5 stars
People	(favourable)
Select	2/5

Jon Pareles of the New York Times stated that "Larry Blackmon's cracked nasal voice keeps the band funny and unpretentious, especially when kicking up its well honed midtempo funk". AllMusic gave the album a three out of five star rating. Chris Heim of the Chicago Tribune noted "The sound is a bit harder and the themes a bit lighter, but this new album basically continues down the path Cameo has followed since trimming down to a trio in the early 1980s. It was then that the group began seriously to experiment with what Blackmon tagged ”black rock,” a musical mix Cameo has never really been adequately credited for helping create. ”Real Men” is another solid example of Cameo`s approach to the sound." Don Waller of the Los Angeles Times also proclaimed "using a krazee-quilt combination of synthetic/organic keyboards ‘n’ hipshot! percussion, greazy basslines and goofbawl vocals, (heavy on the minor sevenths), Cameo rolls back the rug for a wall-to-off-the-wall dance party".

== Singles ==
I Want It Now reached No. 5 on the Billboard Hot R&B Songs chart. Close Quarters also reached No. 38 on the Billboard Hot R&B Songs chart.

== Track listing ==
No.	Title	Writer(s)	Length
1.	"Close Quarters"	Larry Blackmon, Robert Smith, Billy Allen	6:11
2.	"I Want It Now"	Larry Blackmon, Robert Smith, Billy Allen	4:32
3.	"Me"	Larry Blackmon, Robert Smith, Billy Allen	4:31
4.	"Attitude"	Larry Blackmon	3:44
5.	"Get Paid"	Larry Blackmon, Robert Smith, Billy Allen	4:58
6.	"Am I Bad Enough"	Larry Blackmon, Robert Smith, Tomi Jenkins, Billy Allen	5:25
7.	"Time, Fire & Space"	Kevin Kendricks, Tomi Jenkins, Larry Blackmon	3:40
8.	"Nan-Yea"	Jemeal Leftenant, Larry Blackmon, Nathan Leftenant	4:36
9.	"Just a Broken Heart"	Larry Blackmon, Robert Smith, Tomi Jenkins, Billy Allen	4:34

== Personnel ==
Cameo

- Larry Blackmon – lead vocals, backing vocals, drums, percussion
- Tomi Jenkins – lead vocals, backing vocals
- Nathan Leftenant – backing vocals, trumpet

Additional musicians

- Billy Allen – keyboards, programming
- Kevin Kendricks – keyboards, programming
- Charlie Singleton – keyboards, guitars, backing vocals
- Robert Smith – keyboards, programming
- Aaron Mills – bass
- Melvin Wells – saxophones
- Jeryl Bright – trombone
- Smoove & Konduko – scratches
- Willie Morris – lead vocals, backing vocals

=== Production ===
- Larry Blackmon – producer
- Barney Perkins – recording, mixing
- Christopher Rutherford – recording
- Milton Chan – assistant engineer
- Paul Speck – assistant engineer
- Sterling Sound (New York, NY) – mastering location
- Reiner Design Consultants, Inc. – album design
- David Vance – photography
- Fleur Thiemeyer – fashion
- Anderson Phillips – hair

== Charts ==
Chart (1990)	Peak position
US Billboard 200	84
US Top R&B Albums (Billboard)	18
