= Feel Me (album) =

Studio album by Cameo
- Released: 1980
- Recorded: 1979–1980
- Studio: H&L Studios (Englewood Cliffs, New Jersey)
- Genre: Funk; soul
- Length: 37:51
- Label: Chocolate City
- Producer: Larry Blackmon

Cameo chronology
Cameosis (1980)	Feel Me (1980)	Knights of the Sound Table (1981)

Professional ratings
Review scores
Source	Rating
AllMusic	3/5 stars
Christgau's Record Guide: The '80s	B−
The Virgin Encyclopedia of R&B and Soul	3/5 stars

Feel Me is the sixth album by the funk band Cameo, released in 1980.

== Track listing ==
All tracks composed by Anthony Lockett and Larry Blackmon; except where indicated

1. "Throw It Down" - 5:44
2. "Your Love Takes Me Out" - 6:39
3. "Keep It Hot" - 4:42
4. "Feel Me" - 5:56
5. "Is This the Way" - 5:58
6. "Roller Skates" - (Aaron Mills, Nathan Leftenant, Larry Blackmon) 4:40
7. "Better Days" - 4:12

== Personnel ==
Cameo

- Larry Blackmon – lead vocals, backing vocals, drums, percussion
- Tomi Jenkins – lead vocals, backing vocals
- Anthony Lockett – lead vocals, backing vocals, lead guitar, rhythm guitar
- Stephen Moore – lead vocals, backing vocals
- Thomas 'T.C.' Campbell – acoustic piano, Fender Rhodes, Minimoog, Prophet-5
- Gregory Johnson – Fender Rhodes, Moog synthesizer, backing vocals
- Aaron Mills – bass guitar, backing vocals
- Arnett Leftenant – tenor saxophone, backing vocals
- Jeryl Bright – trombone, backing vocals
- Nathan Leftenant – trumpet, backing vocals

Additional musicians

- Randy Stern – Yamaha CS-80, string synthesizer
- Jose Rossy – congas, percussion
- Denny Morouse – baritone saxophone
- Lou Marini – tenor saxophone
- Bob Mintzer – tenor saxophone
- James E. Pugh – trombone
- Dave Taylor – trombone
- Randy Brecker – trumpet
- Jon Faddis – trumpet
- Arthur Young – trumpet
- Sephra Herman – horn contractor

Arrangements

- Larry Blackmon – horn arrangements, vocal arrangements, additional horn arrangements (4, 5, 7)
- Cameo – horn arrangements, vocal arrangements, additional horn arrangements (4, 5, 7)
- The Tity Brothers (Arnett and Nathan Leftenant) – horn arrangements
- Leon Pendarvis – additional horn arrangements (4, 5, 7)

== Production ==
- Larry Blackmon – producer, mixing
- Steve Jerome – engineer, mixing
- Tracey Melvin – assistant engineer
- Nina Rhodes – assistant engineer
- Jack Skinner – mastering at Sterling Sound (New York, NY)
- Phyllis Chotin – art direction
- Art Hotel – design
- Claude Mougin – photography

== Charts ==
=== Weekly charts ===
Chart (1980–1981)	Peak position
US Billboard 200	44
US Top R&B/Hip-Hop Albums (Billboard)	6

=== Year-end charts ===
Chart (1981)	Position
US Top R&B/Hip-Hop Albums (Billboard)	17

=== Singles ===
Year	Single	Chart positions		
Year	Single	US	US R&B	US Dance
1980	"Keep It Hot"	—	4	77
1981	"Feel Me"	—	27	—
