= Emotional Violence =

Studio album by Cameo
- Released: 1992
- Recorded: 1990–1991
- Studios: Encore (Burbank, California); Studio Control (Miami, Florida)
- Genres: Funk; hip-hop
- Length: 47:29
- Label: Reprise
- Producer: Larry Blackmon

Cameo chronology
Real Men... Wear Black (1990)	Emotional Violence (1992)	Shake Your Pants (1992)

Emotional Violence is an album by the American band Cameo, released in 1992. The album was produced by Larry Blackmon.

== Critical reception ==
Professional ratings
Review scores
Source	Rating
AllMusic	2.5/5 stars
Chicago Tribune	1.5/4 stars
NME	1/10
Orlando Sentinel	2/3 stars
(The New) Rolling Stone Album Guide	3/5 stars

The Baltimore Sun wrote that "the album's rhythmic content is as rich as ever." The Chicago Tribune opined that Cameo goes "through the motions in a set of songs so spare and similar that they blur together into one big boring bass line." The Orlando Sentinel determined that "Cameo's arrangements are spacious and funky, the dance beats are compelling, and Blackmon even manages to sneak in worthwhile messages without putting a damper on the party he's starting."

== Track listing ==
All songs written by Larry Blackmon, except where noted.

1. "Emotional Violence" (Blackmon, Tomi Jenkins) - 4:40
2. "Money" (Blackmon, Charlie Singleton) - 5:33
3. "Raw but Tasty" - 4:39
4. "Front Street" (Blackmon, Jenkins, Kevin Kendricks) - 5:19
5. "Kid Don't Believe It" (Blackmon, Kendricks) - 3:48
6. "Another Love" (Blackmon, Jenkins) - 4:44
7. "Don't Crash" - 3:57
8. "Love Yourself" (Blackmon, Jenkins) - 4:43
9. "Nothing Less Than Love" - 5:05
10. "That Kind of Guy" (Blackmon, Kendricks) - 4:55

== Personnel ==
Cameo

- Larry Blackmon – lead vocals, backing vocals, bass guitar, drums, vocal arrangements
- Tomi Jenkins – lead vocals, backing vocals, keyboards, drums
- Charlie Singleton – lead vocals, backing vocals, keyboards, guitars, drums

with:

- Kevin Kendricks – keyboards, drums, backing vocals, additional vocals (1)
- Aaron Mills – bass guitar, backing vocals, additional vocals (1)

Additional musicians

- Jeff Nelson – keyboards
- Jerrold Harris – bass guitar
- Buffalo Soldiers – rap (3)

Production

- Larry Blackmon – producer, art direction
- Chris Rutherford – recording
- Barney Perkins – mixing
- José Blanco – assistant engineer
- Milton Chen – assistant engineer
- Bernie Grundman Mastering (Hollywood, California) – mastering location
- Janet Levinson – art direction, design
- Tracey Landworth – photography
- Fleur Thiemeyer – fashion
- Anderson Phillips – hair
