= Long Gone (album) =

Studio album by Jimmy D. Lane
- Released: January 1997, re-released 2000
- Recorded: October 1995–January 1996
- Genre: Blues
- Label: Analogue

Jimmy D. Lane chronology
Sir Real, Blue Seal (1995)	Long Gone (1997)	Legacy (1998)

Professional ratings
Review scores
Source	Rating
AllMusic	4/5 stars
The Penguin Guide to Blues Recordings	2/4 stars

Long Gone is a metal-edged, guitar blues album released in 1997 by Jimmy D. Lane.

== Track listing ==
1. "Hear My Train a Comin'"
2. "Obsession Babies"
3. "Long Gone"
4. "I Shall Be Released"
5. "Shake, Shiver, Ache"
6. "Rollin' Stone"
7. "Whiskey"
8. "Boom Boom"
9. "White Tears"
10. "Oh What a Feelin'"
11. "California"
12. "I'm in Love"
13. "Tears Without a Shoulder"
