= Classic Cameo =

Compilation album by Cameo
- Released: March 3, 2003
- Genre: R&B, funk
- Label: Mercury
- Producer: Larry Blackmon

Cameo chronology
| Original Artist Hit List (2003) | Classic Cameo (2003) | The Best of Cameo (2004) |

Professional ratings
Review scores
| Source | Rating |
|---|---|
| Allmusic | 3/5 stars |

Classic Cameo is a compilation album released by the funk/R&B group Cameo in Europe in 2003. The album appears to focus on the band's hits from the 1980s, instead of a more comprehensive introspective.

== Track listing ==
1. "Word Up!" – 4:20 - Blackmon/Jenkins
2. "Single Life – 4:29 - Blackmon/Jenkins
3. "Candy" – 4:25 - Blackmon/Jenkins
4. "She's Strange" – 3:47 - Blackmon/Jenkins/Leftenant/Singleton
5. "Attack Me With Your Love" – 4:33 - Blackmon/Kendrick
6. "Back and Forth" – 3:53 - Blackmon/Jenkins/Kendrick/Leftenant
7. "I Just Want to Be" – 3:44 - Blackmon/Johnson
8. "Why Have I Lost You" – 5:15 - Blackmon
9. "Sparkle" – 4:04 - Blackmon/Lockett
10. "Keep It Hot" – 4:03 - Blackmon/Lockett
11. "Freaky Dancin'" – 4:17 - Blackmon/Jenkins
12. "She's Mine" – 4:34 - Blackmon/Leftenant/Leftenant/Matthews
13. "Just Be Yourself" – 4:03 - Blackmon/Jenkins/Singleton
14. "A Good-bye" – 4:24 - Blackmon/Leftenant
15. "Shake Your Pants" – 6:18 - Blackmon
16. "You Make Me Work" – 4:42 - Blackmon
