= Shake Your Pants =

Single by Cameo

from the album Cameosis
- Released: August 1980
- Genre: Funk
- Length: 6:21
- Songwriter(s): Larry Blackmon
- Producer(s): Larry Blackmon

Cameo singles chronology
"We're Goin' Out Tonight" (1980)	"Shake Your Pants" (1980)	"Keep It Hot" (1980)

"Shake Your Pants" is a song by American funk band Cameo, released in August 1980 as a single from their fifth studio album, Cameosis. It peaked at number 8 on the Hot Soul Singles chart.

== Charts ==
Chart (1980)	Peak position
US Dance Club Songs (Billboard)	57
US Hot R&B/Hip-Hop Songs (Billboard)	8
