= Rigor Mortis (song) =

Single by Cameo

from the album Cardiac Arrest
- Released: April 20, 1977
- Recorded: 1977
- Genre: Funk
- Length: 3:28
- Songwriters: Larry Blackmon; Nathan Leftenant; Arnett Leftenant

Cameo singles chronology
"Find My Way" (1975)	"Rigor Mortis" (1977)	"Post Mortem" (1977)

"Rigor Mortis" is a song by American funk band Cameo, released on April 20, 1977, as a single from their debut studio album, Cardiac Arrest. In the US, the song peaked at number 33 on the Hot Soul Singles chart. In this instance "Rigor Mortis" is a euphemism for being lonesome on the dance floor.

== Reception ==
Barry Michael Cooper of Spin wrote, "The first time I heard Cameo's song "Rigor Mortis", I knew there was something different about the guys that sang it. They didn't have that West Coast studio glitz nor a midwestern twang in their vocals. They were gritty, raw, alley-honed, and street sharp."

== Charts ==
Chart (1977)	Peak position
US Hot R&B/Hip-Hop Songs (Billboard)	33

== In the media ==
- "Rigor Mortis" was sampled in Brand Nubian's song "Brand Nubian".
- DJ Quik sampled "Rigor Mortis" for his song "Get at Me".
