= Knights of the Sound Table =

Studio album by Cameo
- Released: May 18, 1981
- Recorded: 1980–1981
- Studio: H&L Studios (Englewood Cliffs, New Jersey); Power Station (New York City, New York)
- Genre: Funk
- Length: 33:31
- Label: Chocolate City
- Producer: Larry Blackmon

Cameo chronology
Feel Me (1980)	Knights of the Sound Table (1981)	Alligator Woman (1982)

Knights of the Sound Table is the seventh album by the funk band Cameo, released in 1981. It reached number 2 for 3 weeks on the Top R&B/Hip-Hop Albums chart, number 44 on the Billboard 200 chart), and was the band’s fourth consecutive album to be certified Gold by the RIAA for sales of over 500,000 copies. The album spawned two hit singles: "Freaky Dancin'" (which reached number 3 R&B) and "I Like It" (which reached number 25 R&B. The track "Don't Be So Cool" features a guest appearance by former Labelle member Nona Hendryx and received airplay on R&B stations at the time. Hendryx joined Cameo for a performance of the song on Soul Train that first aired on June 20, 1981.

== Critical reception ==
Professional ratings
Review scores
Source	Rating
AllMusic	2.5/5 stars

Amy Hanson of AllMusic called it "the sound of a band keeping their past alive while stretching their wings to the future."

== Track listing ==
No.	Title	Writer(s)	Length
1.	"Knights by Nights"	Larry Blackmon, Aaron Mills, Thomas 'T.C.' Campbell	3:31
2.	"Freaky Dancin'"	Blackmon, Tomi Jenkins	5:23
3.	"I Never Knew"	Blackmon, Anthony Lockett	4:40
4.	"Use It or Lose It"	Blackmon	4:11
5.	"The Sound Table"	Blackmon, Lockett, Mills	3:41
6.	"Don't Be So Cool"	Blackmon, Mills	4:14
7.	"I'll Always Stay"	Blackmon, Lockett	3:54
8.	"I Like It"	Blackmon, Lockett, Campbell	4:12

== Personnel ==
Cameo

- Larry Blackmon – lead vocals, backing vocals, drums, percussion, horn arrangements
- Tomi Jenkins – lead vocals, backing vocals
- Stephen Moore – lead vocals, backing vocals
- Charlie Singleton – lead vocals, backing vocals
- Thomas 'T.C.' Campbell – acoustic piano, Fender Rhodes, Moog synthesizer, Prophet-5
- Gregory Johnson – Moog synthesizer, Fender Rhodes, backing vocals
- Anthony Lockett – lead guitar, rhythm guitar, backing vocals
- Aaron Mills – bass guitar, backing vocals
- Arnett Leftenant – tenor saxophone, backing vocals, horn arrangements
- Jeryl Bright – trombone, backing vocals, horn arrangements
- Nathan Leftenant – trumpet, backing vocals, horn arrangements

Additional musicians

- Jose Rossy – percussion
- Clifford Adams – trombone
- David Webber – trumpet
- Tom Tom 84 – horn and string arrangements
- Nona Hendryx – backing vocals (6)

=== Production ===
- Larry Blackmon – producer
- Larry Alexander – engineer
- Steve Jerome – engineer
- Jason Corsaro – assistant engineer
- Jeff Hendrickson – assistant engineer
- Tracey Melvin – assistant engineer
- Jack Skinner – mastering at Sterling Sound (New York, NY)
- Bob Heimall – art direction
- Bill Levy – art direction
- Anthony Barboza – photography
- Ron Walotsky – illustration
- Vicky Davis – fashion accessories
- Bruce Keller – make-up
- Lucinda Shankle – hair stylist

== Charts ==
Chart (1981)	Peak position
US Billboard 200	44
US Top R&B/Hip-Hop Albums (Billboard)	2

=== Singles ===
Year	Single	Chart positions		
Year	Single	US	US R&B	US Dance
1981	"Freaky Dancin'"	—	3	45
1981	"I Like It"	—	25	—
