= Candy (Cameo song) =

Single by Cameo

from the album Word Up!
- B-side: "She's Strange"
- Released: 1986
- Genre: Electro-funk; R&B
- Length: 5:39; 4:20 (7-inch edit)
- Label: Atlanta Artists
- Songwriters: Larry Blackmon; Thomas Jenkins
- Producer: Larry Blackmon

Cameo singles chronology
| "Word Up!" (1986) | "Candy" (1986) | "Back and Forth" (1987) |

Music video
- "Candy" on YouTube

"Candy" is a song by the American funk band Cameo, released as the second single from their 1986 album Word Up!. The song features a solo by saxophonist Michael Brecker. "Honey", a reworked version with different lyrics was included on their next album, Machismo. In 2001, the song was sampled by singer Mariah Carey in her single, "Loverboy", with Cameo recording new vocals and appearing as the featured artist.

== Charts ==
In America, "Candy" reached number 21 on the Billboard Hot 100 and number 1 on the R&B charts in early 1987, causing Aretha Franklin's "Jimmy Lee" to stop at number 2.

"Candy" also made the Top 10 on the US Dance charts and number 27 in the United Kingdom in late 1986.

| Chart (1986–1987) | Peak position |
|---|---|
| UK Singles (Official Charts) | 27 |
| US Billboard Hot 100 | 21 |
| US Dance Club Songs (Billboard) | 10 |
| US Hot R&B/Hip-Hop Songs (Billboard) | 1 |

== Certifications ==
| Region | Certification | Certified units/sales |
|---|---|---|
| United Kingdom (BPI) | Silver | 200,000^{‡} |
^{‡} Sales+streaming figures based on certification alone.

== Music video ==
The music video, shot on film, was directed by Polish filmmaker Zbigniew Rybczyński. Set against a backdrop of Times Square and various neon signs, the video features a high level of video compositing, with multiple layers of the band members and dancers appearing on screen in varying sizes and depths of field at once.

== Personnel ==
Cameo

- Larry Blackmon – lead vocals
- Tomi Jenkins – lead vocals

Additional musicians

- Merv De Peyer, Kenni Hairston, Kevin Kendrick, Eric Rehl, Bernard Wright – keyboards
- Peter Scherer – Synclavier programming
- Pat Buchanan, Charlie Singleton – guitars
- Michael Burnett, Aaron Mills – bass guitar
- Sammy Merendino – drum programming
- Duduka Da Fonseca, Giovanni Hidalgo – percussion
- Michael Brecker – tenor sax solo
- Randy Brecker – trumpet
- Willie Morris – backing vocals

Uptown Horns

- Crispin Cioe – alto saxophone, baritone saxophone
- Arno Hecht – tenor saxophone
- Bob Funk – trombone
- Paul Litteral – trumpet
