= Style (Cameo album) =

Studio album by Cameo
- Released: April 11, 1983
- Studio: Cheshire Sound Studios (Atlanta, Georgia)
- Genre: Funk
- Length: 37:29
- Label: Atlanta Artists
- Producer: Larry Blackmon

Cameo chronology
Alligator Woman (1982)	Style (1983)	She's Strange (1984)

Professional ratings
Review scores
Source	Rating
AllMusic	2.5/5 stars
The Village Voice	B+

Style is the ninth studio album by the American funk band Cameo, released in 1983. It was their first album to introduce their Atlanta Artists label, with which they maintained their distribution through PolyGram.

At the time, Cameo was going through a transition, having gone from five members (Alligator Woman, 1982) to four, with an extreme makeover in their sound. Their former big funk band sound was now being replaced by all the elements of the electronic age (i.e., keyboards, synthesizers and Simmons drums). Their music was self-proclaimed as "21st Century Bebop".

== Track listing ==
1. "Aphrodisiac" – 5:00 (Larry Blackmon, Charlie Singleton, Nathan Leftenant, Tomi Jenkins)
2. "This Life Is Not for Me" – 3:30 (Blackmon, Singleton, Leftenant, Jenkins)
3. "You're a Winner" – 3:30 (Blackmon, Singleton, Leftenant, Jenkins)
4. "Can't Help Falling in Love" – 3:50 (Luigi Creatore, Hugo Peretti, George David Weiss)
5. "Interlude (Serenity)" – 1:30 (Singleton)
6. "Style" – 5:12 (Blackmon, Singleton, Leftenant, Jenkins)
7. "Cameo's Dance" – 3:23 (Blackmon, Singleton, Leftenant, Jenkins)
8. "Let's Not Talk Slot" – 3:31 (Blackmon, Singleton, Leftenant, Jenkins)
9. "Slow Movin'" – 3:24 (Blackmon, Singleton, Leftenant, Jenkins)
10. "Heaven Only Knows" – 3:37 (Blackmon, Kevin Kendrick, Singleton, Leftenant, Jenkins)

== Personnel ==
Cameo

- Larry Blackmon – lead and backing vocals, bass guitar, drums, percussion
- Tomi Jenkins – lead and backing vocals
- Charlie Singleton – lead and backing vocals, keyboards, synthesizers, guitars, bass guitar
- Nathan Leftenant – trumpet, backing vocals

Additional musicians

- Kevin Kendrick – Prophet-5, Roland Jupiter-8, Fender Rhodes, grand piano, Minimoog, Yamaha grand piano

=== Production ===
- Larry Blackmon – producer, mixing
- Tom Race – engineer, mixing
- Charlie Singleton – mixing
- Kenny LaMorta – assistant engineer
- Jack Skinner – mastering at Sterling Sound (New York, NY)
- Bill Levy – art direction
- Garrett/Lewis/Johnson – art design
- Anthony Barboza – photography
- Yolanda McCoy – hair stylist
- Atlanta Artists Management, Inc. – management and direction

== Charts ==
Chart (1983)	Peak position
US Billboard 200	53
US Top R&B/Hip-Hop Albums (Billboard)	14
