= Word Up! (album) =

Studio album by Cameo
- Released: September 9, 1986
- Recorded: 1985–1986
- Studio: Quad Recording; Counter Point; Power Station; Sound Ideas (New York City)
- Genre: Funk
- Length: 34:46
- Label: Atlanta Artists/PolyGram
- Producer: Larry Blackmon

Cameo chronology
Single Life (1985)	Word Up! (1986)	Machismo (1988)

Singles from Word Up!
- 1. "Word Up!" Released: July 1986; 2. "Candy" Released: October 21, 1986; 3. "Back and Forth" Released: February 24, 1987; 4. "She's Mine" Released: June 1987

Professional ratings
Review scores
Source	Rating
AllMusic	4.5/5 stars
The Village Voice	B

Word Up! is the 13th studio album by American funk group Cameo, which was released in 1986. The album reached number 1 on the Top R&B/Hip-Hop Albums chart, number 8 on the Billboard Pop Albums chart, and was certified Platinum by the RIAA for sales of over 1 million copies. It took Cameo to its highest level of popularity and solidified them as one of the most successful bands of the 1980s. The album includes three of its biggest hit singles, "Word Up!" "Candy", and "Back and Forth".

== Track listing ==
No.	Title	Writer(s)	Length
1.	"Word Up!"	Larry Blackmon; Tomi Jenkins	4:21
2.	"Candy"	Blackmon; Jenkins	5:39
3.	"Back and Forth"	Kevin Kendrick; Nathan Leftenant; Blackmon; Jenkins	6:33
4.	"Don't Be Lonely"	Blackmon; Jenkins; Kendrick; Willie Morris	5:19
5.	"She's Mine"	Blackmon; Leftenant; Antonio Matthews; Ray Malloy	4:37
6.	"Fast, Fierce & Funny"	Blackmon; Jenkins; Leftenant	4:09
7.	"You Can Have the World"	Blackmon; Jenkins; Leftenant	4:38

- Tracks 1–3, 6 and 7 published by All Seeing Eye Music-Better Days Music.
- Tracks 4 and 5 published by All Seeing Eye Music-Better Days Music-Better Nights Music.

== Personnel ==
Cameo

- Larry Blackmon – lead vocals, backing vocals, bass guitar, drums, percussion, horn and vocal arrangements
- Tomi Jenkins – lead vocals, backing vocals, horn and vocal arrangements
- Nathan Leftenant – backing vocals, horn and vocal arrangements

Additional musicians

- Merv De Peyer – keyboards
- Kenni Hairston – keyboards
- Kevin Kendrick – keyboards
- Eric Rehl – keyboards
- Bernard Wright – keyboards
- Peter Scherer – Synclavier programming
- Pat Buchanan – guitars
- Charlie Singleton – guitars, backing vocals
- Michael Burnett – bass guitar, backing vocals
- Aaron Mills – bass guitar
- Sammy Merendino – drum programming
- Duduka Da Fonseca – percussion
- Giovanni Hidalgo – percussion
- Steve Thornton – percussion
- Melvin Wells – saxophone, backing vocals
- Michael Brecker – tenor sax solo (2, 4, 5)
- Randy Brecker – trumpet
- Willie Morris – backing vocals

Uptown Horns

- Crispin Cioe – alto saxophone, baritone saxophone
- Arno Hecht – tenor saxophone
- Bob Funk – trombone
- Paul Litteral – trumpet

== Production ==
- Larry Blackmon – producer
- Larry Alexander – recording engineer
- Matthew Kasha – recording engineer, mix engineer
- Eric Calvi – recording engineer, mix engineer
- Michel Sauvage – recording engineer
- Jerry Solomon – recording engineer
- Alan Meyerson – mix engineer
- Dave Ogrin – mix engineer
- Henry Falco – assistant engineer
- José Rodriguez – mastering at Sterling Sound (New York, NY)
- David Krebs – direction
- Steve Leber – direction
- Louis Levin – direction
- Bill Levy – art direction
- Paula Scher – design
- Chris Callas – photography
- Toyce Anderson – stylist
- John Dellaria – hair, make-up
- Valerie Dray - make-up
- Jean Paul Gaultier – clothes

== Critical reception ==
=== Accolades ===
Word Up! was ranked number 5 among the "Albums of the Year" by NME.

== Charts ==
=== Weekly charts ===
Chart (1986)	Peak position
Australian Albums Chart	75
Canadian Albums Chart	72
Dutch Albums Chart	48
German Albums Chart	34
New Zealand Albums Chart	13
Switzerland Albums Chart	30
UK Albums Chart	7
US Billboard 200	8
US Top R&B/Hip-Hop Albums	1

== Certifications ==
Certifications for Word Up!
Region	Certification	Certified units/sales
United Kingdom (BPI)	Gold	100,000^{^}
United States (RIAA)	Platinum	1,000,000^{^}
^{^} Shipments figures based on certification alone.
