= Legacy (soul group) =

Legacy was a five-person American soul group founded in 1979. The group consisted of producer and songwriter Ben McCray, drummer Al McCray, and singers Barbara Hernandez, Rita Saunders, and Deborah McGriff.

Legacy's first single was "Word Up". Billboard wrote "Legacy's 'Word Up' (Brunswick 12-inch) has all the best hot-and-cool elements of Slave's recent hits: rock steady drumming, a cute girl chorus, and a skillful, slurred male lead. There are several catchy hooks, too."
