= She's Strange =

Studio album by Cameo
- Released: January 16, 1984
- Recorded: 1983
- Studio: Unique Recording Studios (New York City)
- Genre: Funk
- Length: 36:44
- Label: Atlanta Artists
- Producer: Larry Blackmon

Cameo chronology
Style (1983)	She's Strange (1984)	Single Life (1985)

Singles from She's Strange
- 1. "She's Strange" Released: February 24, 1984; 2. "Talkin' Out the Side of Your Neck" Released: May 17, 1984; 3. "Hangin' Downtown" Released: August 20, 1984

Professional ratings
Review scores
Source	Rating
AllMusic	4/5 stars

She's Strange is the tenth studio album by the American funk band Cameo, released in 1984. It reached number 1 on the Billboard R&B Albums chart, number 27 on the Billboard Pop Albums chart, and was certified Gold by the RIAA for sales of over 500,000 copies.

This album is dedicated to the late PolyGram A&R representative Bill Haywood; as Cameo mentions in the liner-notes of the album, "The album which he always wanted". The track "Talkin' Out the Side of Your Neck" is a commonly performed arrangement among marching bands, especially those from HBCUs. The titular track became the group's first number one single on the R&B charts, topping the charts for four weeks in April 1984.

== Track listing ==
1. "She's Strange" – 7:12 (Larry Blackmon, Tomi Jenkins, Nathan Leftenant/Charlie Singleton)
2. "Love You Anyway" – 5:01 (Singleton, Melvin Wells)
3. "Talkin' Out the Side of Your Neck" – 4:04 (Blackmon, Jenkins, Leftenant/Singleton)
4. "Tribute to Bob Marley" – 5:20
5. "Groove With You" – 5:10
6. "Hangin' Downtown" – 5:07 (Kenni Hairston)
7. "Léve Toi!" – 4:50

== Personnel ==
- Rod Antoon – keyboards
- Anthony Barboza – photography
- Larry Blackmon – percussion, arranger, drums, bass guitar, vocals, producer, horn arrangements, mixing
- Michael Burnett – bass guitar
- Glen Christensen – graphic design
- Mac James – artwork
- Tomi Jenkins – vocals
- Steve Jerome – mixing
- Kevin Kendrick – synthesizer, keyboards
- Nathan Leftenant – backing vocals, horn arrangements
- Bill Levy – art direction
- Wesley Phillips – trumpet
- Alan "Funt" Prater – trombone
- Tom Race – engineer, mixing
- Charlie Singleton – synthesizer, guitar, percussion, arranger, keyboards, vocals
- Jack Skinner – mastering
- Melvin Wells – bass guitar, alto saxophone, backing vocals, horn arrangements

== Charts ==
Chart (1984)	Peak position
US Billboard 200	27
US Top R&B/Hip-Hop Albums (Billboard)	1

== Later samples ==
- "She's Strange"
  - "Young Niggaz" by 2Pac from the album Me Against the World
  - "She's Strange" by Nate Dogg from the album G-Funk Classics, Vol. 1 & 2
  - "We Want Yo Hands Up" by Mr. Malik featuring Warren G and Hershey Locc
  - "The Party Continues" by Jermaine Dupri featuring Da Brat and Usher from the album Life in 1472
  - "Kill 'em with the Shoulders" by Snoop Dogg featuring Lil Duval
