= Nasty (album) =

Live album by Cameo
- Released: July 5, 1996
- Length: 64:08
- Label: Intersound
- Producer: Larry Blackmon

Cameo chronology
| The Best of Cameo, Volume 2 (1996) | Nasty (1996) | Best of Cameo (1998) |

Professional ratings
Review scores
| Source | Rating |
|---|---|
| Allmusic | 3/5 stars |

Nasty is a live album released by the funk group Cameo in 1996. In addition to the live material, two new studio tracks were included: "Come Fly With Me" and the album's title track, both written by Larry Blackmon. The "Mega-Mix" is a remix of the album's live tracks. The new studio tracks on this release were the only newly written material released by the band for the next five albums.

== Track listing ==
1. "Intro" – 1:03
2. "Flirt" – 1:36 - Blackmon, Jenkins
3. "She's Strange" – 2:37 - Blackmon, Jenkins, Leftenant, Singleton
4. "Back and Forth" – 5:54 - Blackmon, Jenkins, Kendrick, Leftenant
5. "Skin I'm In" – 5:09 - Blackmon
6. "Why Have I Lost You" – 6:10 - Blackmon
7. "Sparkle" – 4:23 - Blackmon, Lockett
8. "Candy" – 4:45 - Blackmon, Jenkins
9. "Shake Your Pants" (Intro) – 0:42
10. "Shake Your Pants" – 4:00 - Blackmon
11. "I Just Want to Be" – 1:38 - Blackmon, Johnson
12. "Keep It Hot" – 5:12 - Blackmon, Lockett
13. "Word Up!" – 6:44 - Blackmon, Jenkins
14. "Come Fly With Me" – 3:57 - Blackmon
15. "Nasty" – 3:44 - Blackmon
16. "Mega-Mix" – 6:27 - Cameo
