= Word Up! (song) =

1986 single by Cameo

Single by Cameo

from the album Word Up!
- B-side: "Urban Warrior"
- Released: 1986
- Genre: Funk; funk rock; synth-funk
- Length: 4:21
- Label: Atlanta Artists; Mercury
- Songwriters: Larry Blackmon; Tomi Jenkins
- Producer: Larry Blackmon

Cameo singles chronology
"Single Life" (1985)	"Word Up!" (1986)	"Candy" (1986)

Music video
- "Word Up!" on YouTube

"Word Up!" is a song by American funk band Cameo. It was released by Atlanta Artists and Mercury Records as the first single from their 13th studio album, Word Up! (1986). The song was written by band members Larry Blackmon and Tomi Jenkins and produced by Blackmon. Its frequent airing on American dance, R&B, and contemporary hit radio, as well as its MTV music video (in which LeVar Burton appears as a police detective trying to arrest the band), helped the single become a hit, allowing it to reach number six in the United States and Australia, number three in the United Kingdom, and number one in New Zealand. Several musical artists have covered the song since its release.

== Composition ==
"Word Up!" is a departure from the disco-influenced sound of Cameo's earlier work, and has been described as funk, funk rock and synth-funk. The song is in A major with a metronome of 112 BPM, but the chorus shifts to F-sharp minor (the relative minor key of A major).

== Release and reception ==
"Word Up!" was Cameo's first US Top 40 hit, peaking at number six on the Billboard Hot 100 and spending three weeks at number one on the Billboard R&B chart and one week at number one on the Billboard Hot Dance Singles chart. John Leland in Spin described it as 'an undiluted rocker'. In the United Kingdom, "Word Up!" spent 10 weeks within the top 40 of the UK Singles Chart, peaking at number three on September 21, 1986. In New Zealand, the song topped the RIANZ Singles Chart for a week in March 1987.

Besides being a commercial success, the track also earned critical acclaim from several publications. "Word Up!" won Cameo the Soul Train Music Award for Best R&B/Soul Single as well as the NME Award for Best Dance Record. Like the band's previous single "Single Life", "Word Up!" features a reference to the opening notes of Ennio Morricone's theme to The Good, the Bad and the Ugly. Cameo were nominated for the Grammy Award for Best R&B Performance by a Duo or Group with Vocals in the 29th Annual Grammy Awards.

Blackmon said of the song:

It just sounded good, and it was before its time. You can play "Word Up" anyplace anywhere, and someone is going to be grooving and bobbing their head. Our sound was unique, as well. I haven't heard another one like it, and we probably won't hear another one like it in the future. It was that significant for us.

== Influence and legacy ==
Time Out ranked "Word Up" at number 54 on their "The 100 Best Party Songs" list in 2018. The song has been covered numerous times by other artists. It is an easy song to sing, being riff based and having a simple vocal melody.

== Charts ==
=== Weekly charts ===
Chart (1986–1987)	Peak position
Australia (Kent Music Report)	6
Austria (Ö3 Austria Top 40)	10
Belgium (Ultratop 50 Flanders)	8
Belgium (VRT Top 30 Flanders)	8
Canada Top Singles (RPM)	12
Europe (European Hot 100 Singles)	14
Ireland (IRMA)	8
Italy (Hit Parade)	5
Italy (Musica e dischi)	5
Italy (TV Sorrisi e Canzoni)	6
Italian Airplay (Music & Media)	18
Netherlands (Dutch Top 40)	10
Netherlands (Single Top 100)	9
New Zealand (Recorded Music NZ)	1
Switzerland (Schweizer Hitparade)	13
UK Singles (Official Charts)	3
US Billboard Hot 100	6
US 12-inch Singles Sales (Billboard)	3
US Dance/Disco Club Play (Billboard)	1
US Hot Black Singles (Billboard)	1
West Germany (GfK)	3

=== Year-end charts ===
Chart (1986)	Position
Netherlands (Dutch Top 40)	94
UK Dance (Music Week)	1
UK Singles (Gallup)	36
US Billboard Hot 100	68
US 12-inch Singles Sales (Billboard)	48
US Hot Black Singles (Billboard)	17

Chart (1987)	Position
New Zealand (RIANZ)	30
West Germany (Media Control)	67

== Certifications ==
Region	Certification	Certified units/sales
Canada (Music Canada)	Gold	50,000^{^}
New Zealand (RMNZ)	Gold	15,000^{‡}
United Kingdom (BPI)	Gold	400,000^{‡}
^{^} Shipments figures based on certification alone.^{‡} Sales+streaming figures based on certification alone.

== Gun version ==
"Word Up!"

Single by Gun

from the album Swagger
- Released: July 1, 1994
- Genre: Hard rock
- Length: 4:13
- Label: A&M
- Songwriters: Larry Blackmon; Tomi Jenkins

Gun singles chronology
"Welcome to the Real World" (1992)	"Word Up!" (1994)	"Don't Say It's Over" (1994)

In the 1990s, "Word Up!" was first covered by Scottish hard rock band Gun, whose version carried a harder, more rock-oriented sound, including a guitar solo. Taken from their third album, Swagger (1994), it was released on July 1, 1994, by A&M Records and peaked number eight on the UK Singles Chart. Two versions of the CD single were released in the UK, each carrying different cover art and different tracks.

=== Critical reception ===
Alan Jones from Music Week gave the Gun-cover four out of five and named it Pick of the Week, saying, "Many rock songs are turned into dance records, but this is a rare example of a song making the reverse journey, being the Glasgow rock band's cover of Cameo's funk outing from 1986. Already used as the playout for TOTP, it works perfectly in its new setting." Pan-European magazine Music & Media wrote, "A good song is half the work. Admit it, with this Cameo oldie, nobody could go wrong. But the Scottish artillery deserves due credit for the guts to cover the funker in a hard rock way." Pete Stanton from Smash Hits gave Gun's version of "Word Up" a full score of five out of five and named it Best New Single, saying, "Very much in the Stiltskin vain, Gun won't have a better chance of having a big hit. It's also one of those songs that should get the grandads moaning about the noise. Wahey!"

=== Charts ===
==== Weekly charts ====
Chart (1994–1995)	Peak position
Belgium (Ultratop 50 Flanders)	41
Belgium (VRT Top 30 Flanders)	24
Europe (European Hit Radio)	25
France (SNEP)	46
Germany (GfK)	32
Ireland (IRMA)	17
Netherlands (Dutch Top 40)	21
Netherlands (Single Top 100)	14
New Zealand (Recorded Music NZ)	39
Scotland (OCC)	4
UK Singles (Official Charts)	8
UK Airplay (Music Week)	20
UK Pop Tip Club Chart (Music Week)	31

==== Year-end charts ====
Chart (1994)	Position
UK Singles (OCC)	112

== Mel B version ==
"Word Up"

Single by Melanie G

from the album Austin Powers: The Spy Who Shagged Me: Music from the Motion Picture
- B-side: "Sophisticated Lady"
- Released: June 28, 1999
- Length: 3:23 (radio edit); 5:23 (single version)
- Label: Warner Bros.; Virgin
- Songwriters: Blackmon; Jenkins
- Producer: Timbaland

Melanie G singles chronology
"I Want You Back" (1998)	"Word Up" (1999)	"Tell Me" (2000)

"Word Up" was covered by British singer Melanie "Mel B" Brown of the Spice Girls—known as Melanie G at that time (and her only single under that name), as she was married to one of the Spice Girls' "Spice Boy" dancers, Jimmy Gulzar—as part of the film soundtrack to Austin Powers: The Spy Who Shagged Me. Produced by Timbaland, the song was released in the UK on June 28, 1999, and peaked at number 13 on the UK Singles Chart. The single was also included on the Japanese edition of Melanie's album Hot. Static sings uncredited background vocals on the track. Brown's bandmate Emma Bunton sings background vocals on the B-side "Sophisticated Lady", with an uncredited rap by Dexter.

Two music videos were created for the song: One live-action, which features Verne Troyer (the Mini-Me actor in the Austin Powers films) and was predominantly filmed with the use of green screen and another that takes places in a black-and-white, highly animated and complex world, entirely digitally animated. In the former, Melanie's character is part evil queen, part dominatrix, her style drawing comparisons to Grace Jones. However, some of the imagery in the video was deemed to be too dark and sexually suggestive, as well as scary, for minors to be exposed to; one scene, for example, portrayed Melanie lying down nude, with a heart covering her private area. Another shows Verne Troyer "polishing" her buttocks like a window-cleaner. Near the end of the video, a child can be seen wearing a dress with the word "Phagocyte" on it. Overall, it was the heavy and potentially scary fantasy imagery that garnered a second version to be made, featuring Melanie in a blue-metallic setting wearing shining, gem-like outfits. The original video was then limited to being played only after midnight on MTV Europe and MTV UK, among other networks.

=== Track listing ===
- Digital download EP
1. "Word Up" (radio edit) – 3:23
2. "Sophisticated Lady" – 2:44
3. "Word Up" (Tim's dance mix) – 5:32

=== Charts ===
Chart (1999)	Peak position
Australia (ARIA)	114
Europe (Eurochart Hot 100)	51
Netherlands (Dutch Top 40 Tipparade)	16
Netherlands (Single Top 100)	86
Scottish Singles Sales (Official Charts)	19
UK Singles (Official Charts)	13

== Korn version ==
"Word Up!"

Single by Korn

from the album Greatest Hits, Vol. 1
- Released: 2004
- Genre: Nu metal; funk metal
- Length: 2:53
- Label: Epic
- Songwriters: Larry Blackmon; Tomi Jenkins
- Producers: Jonathan Davis; Korn; Toby Wright

Korn singles chronology
"Everything I've Known" (2004)	"Word Up!" (2004)	"Twisted Transistor" (2005)

Music video
- "Word Up!" on YouTube

"Word Up!" was covered by American nu metal band Korn. Its musical arrangements are similar to that of the cover version by Gun, except it is played in a lower sounding 7 string guitar tuning instead of the standard E. "Word Up!" was the first track featured on Korn's 2004 retrospective album, Greatest Hits, Volume 1 and was one of two new tracks along with Pink Floyd's "Another Brick in the Wall" that was exclusive to the album (the "Word Up!" CD single also featured a live performance of the latter).

=== Background and release ===
It was released as the album's first single in July 2004 and received heavy airplay on alternative radio at its time of release, peaking in the top 20 of both Billboard charts, whilst making a respectable impression on the mainstream charts of other countries, including Australia (where it debuted at number 28), and Germany (number 46). It is the only Korn single to be sent out to Top 40 radio stations, notably receiving airplay on New York City's Z-100, the largest Top 40 station in the US. Lead singer Jonathan Davis has said of the band's decision to include the song on their greatest hits, "We've been doing 'Word Up!' for years as a sound-check song—not the full version, just messing around with the riff."

=== Charts ===
Chart (2004–2011)	Peak position
Australia (ARIA)	28
Austria (Ö3 Austria Top 40)	58
Belgium (Ultratip Bubbling Under Wallonia)	9
Canada Rock Top 30 (Radio & Records)	28
Finland Download Chart (Suomen virallinen lista)	24
Germany (GfK)	46
Greece (IFPI)	40
Iceland (Fréttablaðið Top 20)	2
Norway (VG-lista)	15
Quebec Airplay (ADISQ)	20
Switzerland (Schweizer Hitparade)	47
UK Rock & Metal (Official Charts)	10
US Bubbling Under Hot 100 (Billboard)	23
US Digital Song Sales (Billboard)	28
US Mainstream Rock Tracks	16
US Modern Rock Tracks	17

=== Certifications ===
Region	Certification	Certified units/sales
New Zealand (RMNZ)	Gold	15,000^{‡}
United Kingdom (BPI)	Silver	200,000^{‡}
^{‡} Sales+streaming figures based on certification alone.

== Jan Delay version ==
"Türlich Türlich (Word Up)"

Single by Jan Delay

from the album Mercedes-Dance-Live
- Released: 2007
- Length: 3:06
- Label: Im- und Export Hanburg-City; Universal
- Songwriters: Larry Blackmon; Tomi Jenkins; Das Bo; Jan Eißfeldt; Kaspar Wiens
- Producer: Jan Delay

Jan Delay singles chronology
"Im Arsch" (2007)	"Türlich Türlich (Word Up)" (2007)	"Alles bleibt anders" (2008)

In 2007 German singer Jan Delay recorded a mashup of the music from "Word Up!" with the lyrics of Das Bo's "Türlich, Türlich (Sicher, Dicker)". The new song was titled "Türlich Türlich (Word Up)" and was a hit in German-speaking countries.

=== Charts ===
Chart (2007)	Peak position
Austria (Ö3 Austria Top 40)	49
Germany (GfK)	31
Switzerland (Schweizer Hitparade)	84

== Little Mix version ==
"Word Up!"

Single by Little Mix
- Released: March 14, 2014
- Genre: Dance-pop
- Length: 3:29
- Label: Syco; Columbia
- Songwriters: Larry Blackmon; Tomi Jenkins
- Producers: TMS; Maegan Cottone

Little Mix singles chronology
"Little Me" (2013)	"Word Up!" (2014)	"Salute" (2014)

Music video
- "Word Up!" on YouTube

British girl group Little Mix released a cover version of the song for Sport Relief 2014, through Syco Music and Columbia Records. It was released digitally on March 16, 2014, followed by a physical release the following day, which was only available to purchase from Sainsbury's supermarkets.

"Word Up!" peaked at number six on the UK Singles Chart and reached the top twenty in Ireland. The song also charted in Australia, Austria, Denmark, France, Czech Republic, and Japan. It has been certified gold in Brazil. The single is also included on the expanded edition of the group's second studio album Salute (2013).

=== Background and release ===
Little Mix first announced the single on January 16, 2014, through their official Twitter. The song was first played on BBC Radio 1 on January 20, 2014, during Nick Grimshaw's Breakfast show.

The cover art of the single was revealed on January 24, 2014.

=== Critical reception ===
The song received mostly positive reviews with Popjustice ranking it as third for the best version of the song and third for the best Sport Relief single and gave the song 7 out of 10 stars. Kevin Kevinpod of DirectLyrics said that "[Little Mix's] harmonies are spot-on, and the whole record is pure fire." and that the song is a chance of the band getting a number one hit. Its production was also likened to Janet Jackson's single "Black Cat."

=== Music video ===
The shooting for the music video started in early February 2014. The band posted an exclusive picture from the video on February 25, 2014. The video was first shown on Chart Show TV on February 28, 2014, and was posted on Vevo on March 3, 2014. It features celebrity cameos from Nick Grimshaw, Louie Spence, Louis Smith, Arlene Phillips, Melanie C and Chris Barrie.

The video starts off with the band in a changing room of a gym. As they walk out of the changing room, Jade tries to pick up a barbell pretending that she cannot lift it but then she lifts it up and walks away carrying it. Perrie then walks along four women who are working out while Jade is on a stationary bicycle among three other women, following the instructions of a trainer. With the bicycle, Jade starts going forward with the rest following her at the back.

The scene then switches to a court with the band exercising and dancing the same time along with other people while singing the chorus of the song. Afterwards, Leigh-Anne is stood in front of some athletes with one using her as a barbell at the end of her part. Jesy continues with her part while dancing in front of two men working out on treadmills and fall off them after some time. During the chorus, the scene changes again to the court with the manager (Barrie, who had previously played leisure centre manager Gordon Brittas in BBC sitcom The Brittas Empire) of the gym seeing the girls and the rest dancing and runs upset out of his office. As he is going down to the court, he sees the athletes in the swimming pool shaping out the title of the song. When he reaches the court, he starts dancing with them.

=== Track listing ===
Digital download

1. "Word Up!" – 3:26

Digital remixes

1. "Word Up!" (The Alias radio edit) – 3:33
2. "Word Up!" (extended mix) – 4:59
3. "Word Up!" (instrumental) – 3:05

CD single

1. "Word Up!" – 3:26
2. "Word Up!" (The Alias radio edit) – 3:33
3. "Word Up!" (extended mix) – 4:59
4. "Word Up!" (instrumental) – 3:05

=== Charts ===
Chart (2014)	Peak position
Australia (ARIA)	45
Austria (Ö3 Austria Top 40)	65
Czech Republic Airplay (ČNS IFPI)	92
Denmark (Tracklisten)	38
France (SNEP)	107
Ireland (IRMA)	13
Japan Hot 100 (Billboard)	71
Scottish Singles Sales (Official Charts)	8
UK Singles (Official Charts)	6
UK Airplay (Music Week)	27

=== Certifications ===
Region	Certification	Certified units/sales
Brazil (Pro-Música Brasil)	Gold	30,000^{‡}
^{‡} Sales+streaming figures based on certification alone.

=== Release history ===
Region	Date	Format	Label
United Kingdom	March 16, 2014	Digital download	Syco
United Kingdom	March 17, 2014	CD single (Exclusive to Sainsbury's)	Syco

== Bibliography ==
- Lucy Green (2008). Music, Informal Learning and the School: A New Classroom Pedagogy. Ashgate Publishing, Ltd. ISBN 9780754662426.
