= Atlanta Artists =

- Parent company: PolyGram; Universal Music Group
- Founded: 1983
- Defunct: 1991
- Status: Defunct
- Distributor(s): Mercury Records
- Genre: Various
- Country of origin: US
- Location: US

Atlanta Artists was a label founded by Larry Blackmon of the group Cameo in 1983. The label was originally distributed by PolyGram. It was formed after Blackmon and Cameo relocated from Brooklyn, New York, to Atlanta, Georgia. The studio gave Blackmon more creative control over Cameo's sound and allowed him to promote local talent such as Ca$hflow. After Cameo left for Reprise Records, Atlanta Artists was absorbed into Mercury Records.

== Origins ==
After Cameo's seventh album, Knights of the Sound Table (1981), Blackmon reduced the group from ten members to a five-member unit. This change was made due to the economics of the music industry at that time. Blackmon relocated the group from New York to Atlanta, Georgia.

With their core of five members, they released the album Alligator Woman, a fusion of funk, new wave and a synthesizer-driven sound (compared to their previous albums which had more horn arrangements).

== Atlanta Artists history ==
The album Style followed in 1983 as the first release for Atlanta Artists. This release continued their new musical direction by adding electronic drums to their production. This new sound was a blueprint for their subsequent albums.

In 1986, Atlanta Artists released Cameo's Word Up!, which the Los Angeles Times rated as "one of the year's best albums".

The funk group Ca$hflow and solo artist Barbara Mitchell (formerly in the female group High Inergy) signed and released for the label, along with teenage solo artist Jilliann (singer), while Blackmon produced also artists on other labels:

- Tomi Jenkins - 1989 / Elektra
- Bobby Brown - 1986 / MCA
- The Reddings - 1985 / Polydor
- George Howard - 1990 / GRP

During Cameo's popular concert tours in the UK around the mid-1980s, Ca$hflow traveled along with them as a supporting act.

In 1990, Atlanta Artists released Real Men Wear Black, which People magazine called "one of the strongest collections in Cameo's 13-album history", suggesting that "almost every song has grand-slam potential".

In 1991, after Cameo's move to Reprise, Atlanta Artists was absorbed into Mercury Records.
