= Chocolate City Records =

Record label subsidiary

- Parent company: Casablanca Records
- Founded: 1975
- Status: Defunct since 1982.
- Distributor: The Island Def Jam Music Group
- Genre: Various
- Country of origin: US
- Location: US

Chocolate City Records was a record label subsidiary of Casablanca Records & Filmworks. It was started in 1975 by Cecil Holmes, Neil Bogart's partner at Casablanca. Its name was a reference to the album Chocolate City by The Parliaments. The label featured artists such as Cameo, founded by Larry Blackmon.

In 1980 the label was sold to PolyGram along with Casablanca, which are now part of Universal Music Group; in 1983 Chocolate City Records went out of business and Cecil Holmes left Casablanca Records & Filmworks and went on to be the VP of Black music for CBS Records.

== Recording history ==
The label's first group were The New York City Players, who later changed their name to Cameo, with singles "Find My Way" and "Rigor Mortis".

The next groups to sign for Chocolate City were Brenda & the Tabulations, with their slow jam entitled "Home To Myself", and Blacksmoke aka Black Smoke, whose self-titled debut Blacksmoke featured the two singles "Your Love Has Got Me Screaming" and "There It Is". The group who used to back Donna Summer were previously called Smoke. Due to legal action instigated by another group also called Smoke, who had released a record, "I'm So Lonely" in 1974, they changed their name to Smoke. The change was reflected on their releases and merchandising. Their single "(Your Love Has Got Me) Screamin'" received a good review in the 10 July issue of Billboard. It was a chart hit, peaking at no. 96 on the Hot Soul Singles chart during its two-week run. Their self-titled album peaked at No. 166 in the Record World 151-200 Album chart during its seven-week run.

In 1977, both Cameo and Brenda & The Tabulations recorded their first albums for Chocolate City Records. Cameo titled their first album Cardiac Arrest. The two singles were "Funk Funk" and "Post Mortem". The first Brenda & The Tabulations album was I Keep Coming Back For More, from which the singles "Let's Go All The Way (Down)" and "Superstar" were taken. In the fall of 1977, Cameo titled their 2nd album We All Know Who We Are. The 4 singles were "C On The Funk", "Why Have I Lost You?", "We All Know Who We Are" and "It's Serious".

In 1978, two new artists signed with Chocolate City Records: the solo singer Vernon Burch, and Townsend, Townsend, Townsend & Rogers. Burch's album was titled Love-A-Thon, with singles "Brighter Days" and "Love Is"; Townsend, Townsend, Townsend & Rogers' album was self-titled and included the single "Bring It Down To The Real" written by Dave Rogers and Ed Townsend.

Four new groups signed with the label in 1980. Randy Brown, who was originally signed to Parachute Records, released his first album under Chocolate City Records: Midnight Desire. Two singles included on this album were "We Outta Be Doin' It" and "It's The Next Best Thing (To Being There)". 7th Wonder, also originally signed to Parachute, released their first album under Chocolate City Records: Thunder. The album included the singles "The Tilt" and "I Enjoy Ya". Starpoint released their self-titled first album. Three hit singles from the album were "I Just Wanna Dance With You", "Get Ready, Get Down" and "Gonna Lift You Up". Kevin Moore released an album entitled Rainmaker, with the hit single "The Way You Hold Me".

In January 1976, another group called the Funkateers signed with Chocolate City. They recorded their hit single titled, "Give What You Got."n
