= Cameo (band) =

American funk band

- Origin: New York City, U.S.
- Genres: Funk; soul; R&B; funk rock
- Works: Cameo discography
- Years active: 1974–2001; 2016–present
- Labels: Chocolate City; Atlanta Artists; Reprise
- Members: Larry Blackmon; Anthony Lockett; Aaron Mills; Jeff Nelson; Kevin Kendrick; Willie Morris
- Past members: Tomi Jenkins; Nathan Leftenant; Jeryl Bright; Gregory B. Johnson; Arnett Leftenant; Charlie Singleton; Robert Branch; Kenni Hairston; Michael Burnett; Thomas Campbell; Wayne Cooper; Merve de Peyer; Gary Dow; Eric Durham; Gregory Johnson; Kurt Jeter; John Kellogg; Kevin Kendrick; Damon Mendes; Stephen Moore; William Morris; Eric Nelson; William Revis; Charles Sampson; Robert L. Smith; Melvin Wells; Paul Andrews; Azza Meah; Arnold Ramsey; Dominic Christie; Harold Gander; Pat Buchanan
- Website: cameonation.com

Cameo is an American funk band that formed in 1974. Cameo was initially a 14-member group known as the New York City Players; this name was later changed to Cameo. The group is best known for the title track and "Candy" from its 1986 album Word Up!

As of the first half of 2009, some of the original members continued to perform together. Two other original members were hired by the hip hop group Outkast. In 2015, Cameo announced a new residency show at the Westgate Las Vegas Resort & Casino, opening in March 2016. On February 20, 2019, Larry Blackmon of Cameo announced "El Passo", the first new single from the band in 19 years.

== Career ==
=== 1974–1979: Formation and early years ===
Formed by Larry Blackmon in 1974 as the New York City Players the band was signed by Casablanca Records to its Chocolate City imprint in 1975 as the Players. The band changed its name after notification by Mercury Records that the name "the Players" was too similar to Mercury's signing, Ohio Players. The name Cameo was taken from a brand of cigarettes the band saw in Canada. Prior to this, Blackmon, keyboardist Gregory Johnson, and Gwen Guthrie formed the band East Coast, together with James Wheeler (alto saxophone), Melvin Whay (bass), Michael Harris (percussion), and Haras Fyre (also known as Pat Grant) on trombone. They released one self-titled album in 1973 on the independent label Encounter.

Cameo's first album was Cardiac Arrest which included the hit single, "Rigor Mortis". Follow up albums We All Know Who We Are, Ugly Ego and Secret Omen contained dance floor songs such as "I Just Want to Be" and "It's Serious", the latter of which was used for a dance contest scene in the 1978 film Thank God It's Friday. The band's debut single, "Find My Way", was a disco song that was used in the film, and was included on the Thank God It's Friday soundtrack. ("Find My Way" was their cover of a 1972 Three Degrees and a 1969 Tymes tune.)

Bassist Aaron Mills joined the band in 1978, after a stint in Donald Byrd's jazz-funk collective N.C.C.U., which toured with Cameo.

=== 1979–1993: Mainstream breakthrough ===
The 1979 single, "I Just Want to Be", reached number 3 on the Billboard magazine Top R&B/Hip-Hop Albums chart, and along with the follow-up single, the top 10 R&B ballad "Sparkle", pushed the album Secret Omen to gold status with sales of over 500,000 copies, the band's first album to achieve this status. Their next album, Cameosis, came out in 1980 and also achieved gold status thanks in large part to the funk classic "Shake Your Pants", the mid-tempo single "We're Goin' Out Tonight", and the ballad "Why Have I Lost You" (a re-recording of a song from their 1978 album We All Know Who We Are). It reached number 1 on the Billboard R&B chart and number 25 on the Billboard 200 chart. Their second album of 1980, Feel Me, 1981's Knights of the Sound Table and 1982's Alligator Woman also went gold and saw the band playing up their eclectic style. Band members Aaron Mills, Thomas "TC" Campbell and Jeryl Bright briefly left the band in 1983 to form a spinoff group called MCB. The band released She's Strange in 1984, which performed well and hit number 1 on the Billboard R&B chart and 26 on the Billboard 200. The album's title track, eponymous single became the band's first number 1 R&B hit, as well as their first charting pop single; reaching number 47 on the Billboard Hot 100.

1985's album Single Life, featuring the title track and "Attack Me with Your Love", hit number 2 on the Top R&B chart. The single "Word Up!" was released in 1986 and reached number 1 on the Billboard R&B chart, plus number 6 on the Billboard Hot 100, becoming the band's biggest single on the pop chart. The follow-up single "Candy" reached number 1 R&B and 21 pop, while their next release, "Back and Forth", went to number 3 R&B and number 50 pop. Meanwhile, the accompanying album also hit numbers 8 and 1 on the Billboard 200 and Top R&B charts respectively, becoming their highest-charting album.

Two years later, Cameo released Machismo to mixed critical reviews and dropped to chart at numbers 10 and 56 on the Top R&B/Hip-Hop Albums and Billboard 200 charts respectively. Cameo then followed up with 1990's Real Men... Wear Black and 1992's Emotional Violence. The previous release was followed by two compilation albums in between the time of their next recording.

=== 1994–2000: Later years ===
In 1994, In the Face of Funk was released on the band's independent label and hit 10 on the Top R&B/Hip-Hop Albums chart. This album was then followed by a six-year unofficial hiatus with several compilation releases, until the next album Sexy Sweet Thing in 2000. The album hit 64 on the Top R&B/Hip-Hop Albums chart, and is their most recent charting release.

=== 2001–2015: Inactivity/unofficial hiatus ===
In 2001, a sample from the band's single "Candy" was used in the Mariah Carey single "Loverboy". The band recorded new vocals for the song and appeared in the music video. The song hit number 2 on the Billboard Hot 100.

These years saw a great period of inactivity and unofficial hiatus, in which time six compilation albums were released. The compilation albums released in this period were, in chronological order: The Hits Collection (2000), 20th Century Masters – The Millennium Collection: The Best of Cameo (2001), Anthology (2002), Classic Cameo (2003), The Best of Cameo (2004), Gold (2005) and The Definitive Collection (2006).

=== 2016–present: Recent years ===
In March 2016, Cameo began a year-long Las Vegas residency show at the Westgate Las Vegas Resort & Casino. In 2019, their single "Candy" was interpolated by Beyoncé for her cover of fellow R&B group Maze's song "Before I Let Go", featured in her film and accompanying live album Homecoming.

== Associated members ==
Kevin Kendrick, Jeff Nelson, Willie Morris, Anthony Lockett and Aaron Mills continue to tour with Cameo as well as other artists. Kevin Kendrick and Aaron Mills have both worked with Outkast, playing on their singles "Ms. Jackson" (2000) and "Prototype" (2003), among other tracks. Ex-Cameo vocalist John Kellogg became an entertainment lawyer, representing such artists as the O'Jays, Gerald Levert and LSG. He also pursued a career in music industry higher education, becoming Assistant Chair of the Music Business/Management department at Berklee College of Music in Boston, Massachusetts. Gregory B. Johnson has released two CDs on his own label, Allspice Record Co.—in 2007 A New Hip, which is a smooth Jazz CD, and in 2012 Funk Funk (Just for a Little Time), an urban funk CD.

== Style ==
Cameo began as a horn-oriented funk band in the 1970s, influenced by Parliament-Funkadelic. Starting in the early 1980s, Cameo expanded their sound with influences from pop, hip hop, rock and reggae, and placed more emphasis on synthesizers and electronic drums, then in 1985 onwards, they started using drum machines instead of live drummers on their albums.

== Discography ==
- Cardiac Arrest (1977)
- We All Know Who We Are (1978)
- Ugly Ego (1978)
- Secret Omen (1979)
- Cameosis (1980)
- Feel Me (1980)
- Knights of the Sound Table (1981)
- Alligator Woman (1982)
- Style (1983)
- She's Strange (1984)
- Single Life (1985)
- Word Up! (1986)
- Machismo (1988)
- Real Men... Wear Black (1990)
- Emotional Violence (1992)
- In the Face of Funk (1994)
- Sexy Sweet Thing (2000)

== See also ==
- List of artists who reached number one on the U.S. Dance Club Songs chart
