= Larry Blackmon =

American vocalist and musician

- Born: Laurence Ernest Blackmon; May 29, 1951 (age 75); New York City, U.S.
- Genres: R&B; soul; funk; disco
- Occupations: Singer; songwriter; record producer; arranger
- Instruments: Vocals; bass guitar; drums; percussion
- Years active: 1971–present
- Labels: Chocolate City; Atlanta Artists; Mercury; Reprise; Way 2 Funky; Raging Bull; Crash; Private I
- Member of: Cameo

Larry Ernest Blackmon (born May 29, 1951) is an American vocalist and musician, known as the lead singer, founder and frontman of the funk and R&B band Cameo.

== Early life and career ==
Born in New York City, on May 29, 1951, Blackmon is the son of former boxer / longtime boxing trainer, (Note: Among Black's more notable trainees are Trevor Berbick, Saoul Mamby, Clyde Gray, Ismael Laguna, Livingstone Bramble, Donovan Boucher, José "King" Roman. and–in collaboration with Richie Giachetti–heavyweight champion Larry Holmes) Lee Black.

Starting the band "East Coast", Blackmon formed the "New York City Players" as a complement to the Ohio Players. Having to rename the group because of a conflict, Blackmon later called the group Cameo. Blackmon lived in Harlem and played drums on several hits for the band Black Ivory. Along with his unique vocal style, Blackmon's other personal touches included sporting an elaborate hi-top fade haircut and a codpiece over his pants. His signature "Ow!" was used as the intro for some of the band's songs. The group Cameo appeared at Adventureland Palace, sponsored by Black Pride Inc., on April 26, 1978. Blackmon founded Atlanta-based funk quartet CA$HFLOW, which had a hit with "Mine All Mine" in 1986.

=== Guest appearances ===
Blackmon appeared as a backing vocalist on Ry Cooder's 1987 album Get Rhythm and Cyndi Lauper's 1989 album A Night to Remember. He also had co-producer credits on Eddie Murphy's 1989 album So Happy. The snare drum sound that Blackmon created for "Word Up!" and "Candy" was duplicated on releases by a wide range of artists.

== Personal life ==
One of Blackmon's sons, Larry Scott Blackmon, is heavily involved in New York politics, becoming a social activist and once running for the New York City Council.

On March 18, 2024, a personal note from Blackmon was posted on Cameo's official Facebook page, apologizing to fans in Palm Springs, California for his last-minute, medically mandated no-show at the previous night's concert.

Until the last possible minute, I tried to make it, but I am human, and due to a medical issue, I just simply was not able to be there with you. [...] I am pleased that we did not cancel the show, and [...] I thank our Cameo band members, many of whom who travelled a great distance to deliver the Cameo funk. I am well and I send everyone my sincerest apologies. The funk is here to stay and I hope to see you again very soon.

== See also ==
- Atlanta Artists
