= 1st Word =

Word processor for Atari ST computers

- Developer: GST Computer Systems
- Initial release: December 1985
- Final release: 3.20TT / early 1991
- Operating system: Atari TOS, others
- Type: Word Processor
- License: Proprietary

1st Word is a word processor program for the Atari ST developed by GST Computer Systems and published in 1985. It was given away with all ST systems from December 1985 for the next two years. Although it was relatively well received, it was a very simple program, lacking most power features. It was also very slow when working in large documents. Despite these limitations, its wide availability made the program's .DOC (not Microsoft's .DOC) file format become a de facto standard for the platform and it was widely supported by other programs like desktop publishing systems.

1st Word Plus was a greatly improved version released by GST when the bundling deal ended in 1987. This addressed performance issues and added dozens of features that made it one of the faster and most feature-packed word processors on the platform. Among its more notable additions were a spell checker, mail merge, and support for footnotes and similar long-document editing features. This became one of the best-selling programs on the ST and saw a number of revisions over its lifetime. Plus was later ported to the Acorn Archimedes and IBM PC under GEM as First Word Plus.

In 1990, an entirely unrelated program known as 1st Word Plus 4.0 was released by Compo Software. This used a new file format, and while it could load files from the original 1st Word, the older versions could not read the newer files.

== History ==
Atari released the ST in the summer of 1985, and to ensure there was some useful software at release, they bundled it with the ST Writer word processor. This was a purely text-mode program that had been ported from the best-selling Atari 8-bit program, AtariWriter. The company made it clear ST Writer was being offered only as a stop-gap solution while a graphical user interface (GUI) program was being developed, known as GEMwrite.

For reasons unknown, the company contracted GST Computer Systems of Cambridge, UK to port their Sinclair QL products to the ST. In December 1985, Atari began bundling their 1st Word with the ST. At the time Atari suggested this would be a short-term arrangement while GEMwrite was completed, but from this point on any mention of GEMwrite disappears and it was never released.

The bundling deal with GST would last for two years. When the deal concluded in late 1987, GST released 1st Word Plus, a major update. This became a best-seller for the rest of the platform's history. 1st Word Plus version 2.0 credits Mike Bees, Howard Chalkley, Phil Champ, Martin Dickens, Chris Scheybeler, and Alun Gladman. GST continued updating the program on the ST, releasing 3.0 in late 1998. A series of 3.x releases followed, finishing with 3.20TT in January or February 1991. This version had been updated to work on the Atari TT030 series machines, along with a number of other fixes.

Acorn Computers commissioned GST to make a version known as First Word Plus available for the Archimedes range of computers. It was released on the Arthur operating system in 1988, priced at £92. After the release of RISC OS, a new version of the software was released to take advantage of the multi-tasking environment. This version did not make use of the system's own printing architecture and accompanying drivers, retaining its own drivers to take advantage of printer features such as "near-letter quality" modes. Also priced at £92, with an upgrade from the earlier version costing £45, the software was regarded as not providing any "giant leap forward in capability" from similar products on Acorn's 8-bit computers, but nevertheless made the activities of such a "simple system" easier to accomplish on the more capable hardware, lending itself to efficient use of dot-matrix or daisy wheel printers. It was also considered a useful companion to Acorn Desktop Publisher - a derivative of GST's Timeworks software - making a "neat system" for users with 2 MB of RAM. Other vendors of Document Processors, for RISC OS, offered support for the 1st Word file format, with the likes of EasiWriter / TechWriter offering the ability to convert 1st Word documents to its own, text, RTF, HTML, Microsoft Word, Open Doc, Postscript, or TeX files.

A PC version was produced that ran using Digital Research's GEM interface. Other versions were produced for the Torch XXX and for Digital Research's CP/M and FlexOS.

In 1992, Compo Software released 1st Word Plus 4.0. This was an entirely different program with nothing in common with its namesake, simply using that name to provide visibility.

== Description ==
1st Word is a GEM program and follows its conventions fairly closely. When opened, it presents a document window, either empty or containing the opened document, along with a standard menu bar along the top of the display. It broke from tradition in adding a separate area along the bottom of the screen that displayed various function key commands. This was relatively large, taking up room that would otherwise be used to display the document itself. This became a feature found in a number of similar programs; WordUp took this further with two lines of such keys. Along the left side of the screen, normally under a document window, was a second display showing all of the available characters for the selected printer.

In contrast to the Macintosh, the ST did not normally work in a multi-font environment, and required the separate GDOS device drivers to be loaded from disk to do so. This meant that most programs on the system, including 1st Word, were limited to the single system font. This was not a significant limitation at the time, as most printers of the era had only limited font support or, in the case of daisy wheel printers, only one font and no styles. Although dot matrix printers could produce any font or size by outputting them as graphics, as was the case on the Macintosh, this was slow and offered limited quality. Most word processors on the ST thus used whatever font was directly supported by the printer, outputting the text as ASCII and using control characters where appropriate. 1st Word could take this to the extreme, printing or exporting as pure text.

The text-mode display on the ST had a number of limitations. While it could display italics, it did not directly support superscripts or subscripts, or underlining. 1st Word could display underlining, but this did not follow the text during typing and only updated during a reformat. Nor was text layout as-you-type, fixing word-wrapping and paragraph and page layout also occurred only during a reformat run, triggered through a menu command. The program used block-mode selections using the mouse as the basis for most editing, including cut-and-paste and similar changes. It also included the ability to save a selection to a file or load it from a file, allowing documents to easily include boilerplate text. It included search and replace as well as the ability to place up to four markers within the program that could be quickly accessed from the menu, scrolling the document to that point.

This version was designed to operate in one of two modes, text editing or word processing. In the former, features such as word-wrapping and character styles were turned off and the documents were saved as plain ASCII. Word processing mode turned these features on, saving documents in their own private .DOC format. The original 1st Word was otherwise quite limited, lacking support for common features such as double-spacing, multi-line header and footer text, date and time, and footnotes. One oddity is that all the document windows had to be closed before the files could be printed. It was also quite slow at moving around large documents, scrolling to the bottom of a large document "took ages."

1st Word Plus added a huge number of new features while still remaining very similar to the original in most ways. The only major change in screen layout was to move the window displaying the available character codes from the right side of the display to the centre, leaving room for a new smaller display of control keys like delete and return. Among the many new features was a spell checker with a 40,000 word dictionary, although lacking many American English terms, a mail merge program, footnotes and semi-automated hyphenation. The spell checker included the relatively rare, for the time, option to check on-the-fly. It also added document statistics display, including the number of characters, pages, etc.

The two headlining features of the Plus was the addition of on-screen text styles, not just underlining and italic, that continued to update as the document was edited, and the ability to include graphics and wrap text around them. The program only supported a single graphics format, GEM's own file format, which was used by practically no programs on the ST. A desk accessory, Snapshot, was used to convert other formats into GEM files for inclusion. It also improved overall performance. It did, however, still require a manual reformatting after changing the text.

== Reception ==
When it was originally released, reviews of the program were relatively positive. An early review in Antic noted its limited features, single documents, and lack of on-the-fly reformatting. But it concluded that "Its best feature is an outstanding robustness-it has yet to crash and dump me into a desktop full of bombs. I only wish 1st-Word had been available last summer!" But when mentioning its stability, the review notes "It is good that all of 1st-Word's formatting features work flawlessly, since there are so few of them."

Atari's own magazine, Atari Explorer, reviewed the 1.06 version in early 1987. They note that its wide distribution made the .DOC format a de facto standard, saying "you almost have to have 1st Word because it is the program you are most likely to have in common." Having moved from all-text programs to a GUI with some hesitation due to performance, they are happy that "Text entry is smooth and straightforward; no matter how fast you type, 1st Word keeps up and never drops a character." The same reviewer wrote about Plus shortly after its release and was very positive. Calling it "a truly full-featured word processor" that "can hold its own against control-code ridden" programs. It goes on to praise its documentation, saying it is "without a doubt, the best-documented piece of software for the ST I have seen to date." It concludes, "All things considered, I think 1st Word Plus is an outstanding package."

STart magazine was also very happy with the Plus release, calling it "a dramatic upgrade of 1st Word", and "a powerful contender in the word processing market." They were not so happy with the documentation, saying it was too detailed to make it easy to skim for users already familiar with basic operations on the ST, and lacking an index. The online help was largely dismissed. The reviewer did note one significant problem; the program did not check if there was enough memory to load the spell checker dictionary, and would crash if one attempted to do so while many desk accessories were loaded. They also knocked it for lacking any keyboard controls, even for common operations like cut and paste or moving about using cursor keys. It concludes "I would recommend it as an ideal word processor for students because of its spell checker, footnote ability and flexible margins for indented quotations and bibliographies. It also has all the strengths of a business word processor with its ability to keep 'skeleton' formats on disk and its accompanying 1st Merge utility."

Atari ST disk magazine ST News was written entirely using 1st Word and later 1st Word Plus. The first Volume (1986) was distributed as a plain 1st Word .DOC file, and after that a custom shell was produced that enabled the 1st Word documents to be displayed independently. 1st Word was reviewed several times in the magazine. The first review, for the 3.0 release in 1998, noted a number of changes to the command-key layouts and the ability to move the displays of these keys and the character set. Among the other minor changes was the removal of the Delete command, leaving only Cut, which presented a dialog every time it was used. Another annoyance was the addition of a blinking cursor that could not be turned off. On the plus side, the program finally added command key shortcuts for many common functions, improvements to the spell checker and a host of other additions. It concludes "If GST keeps bringing out updates like this, then First Word Plus is going to remain the most highly recommended mid-price GEM based word processor for a long time to come." The Delete Block command was re-added to the 3.15 version.
