= Price targeting =

Price targeting may refer to:

- Price discrimination, in which a good or service is sold at different prices to different consumers
- Price point, a model of pricing
- A mechanism in monetary policy; see Monetary policy#Types
