= Shopping =

Buying goods

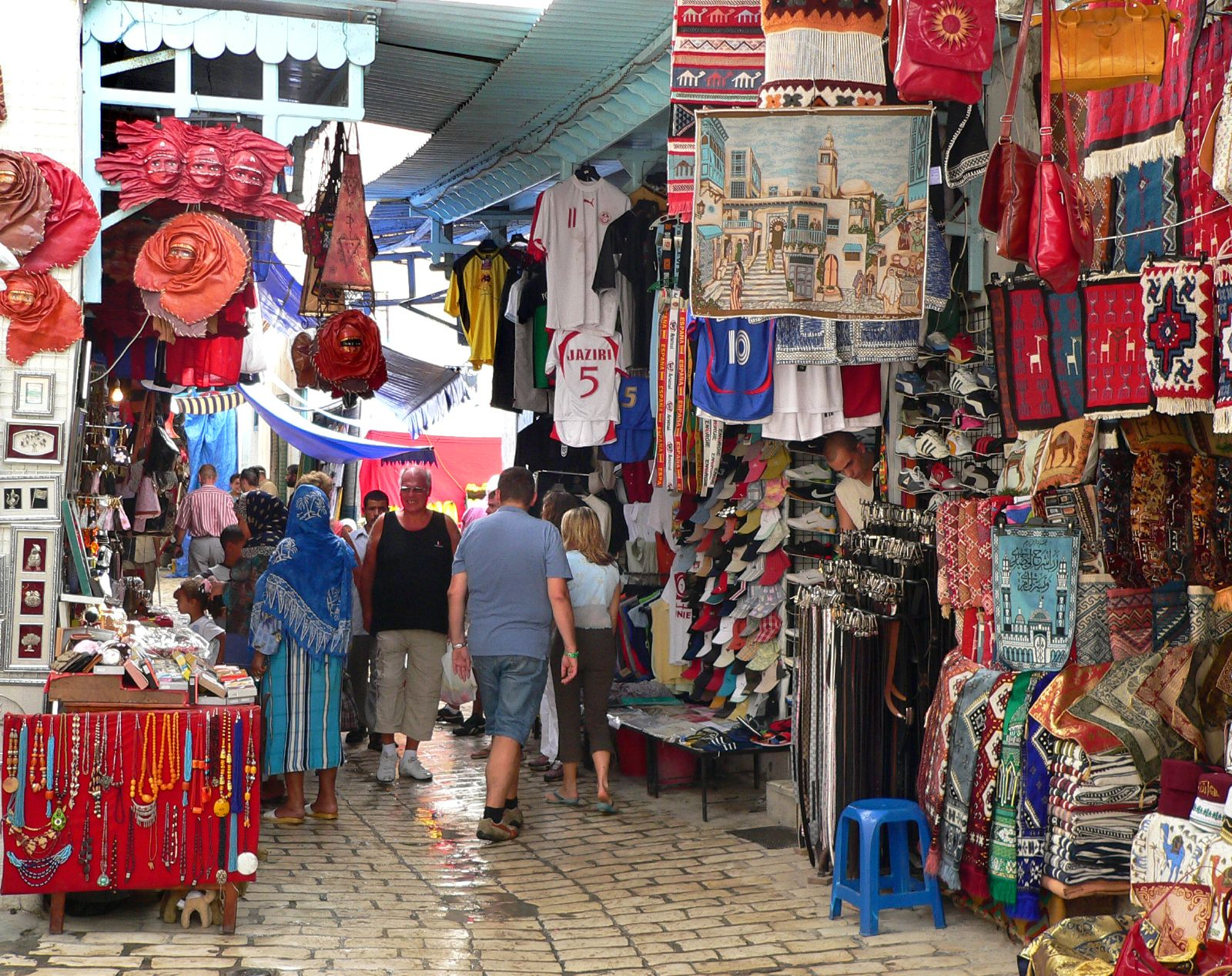
Shoppers at a souk in Tunisia

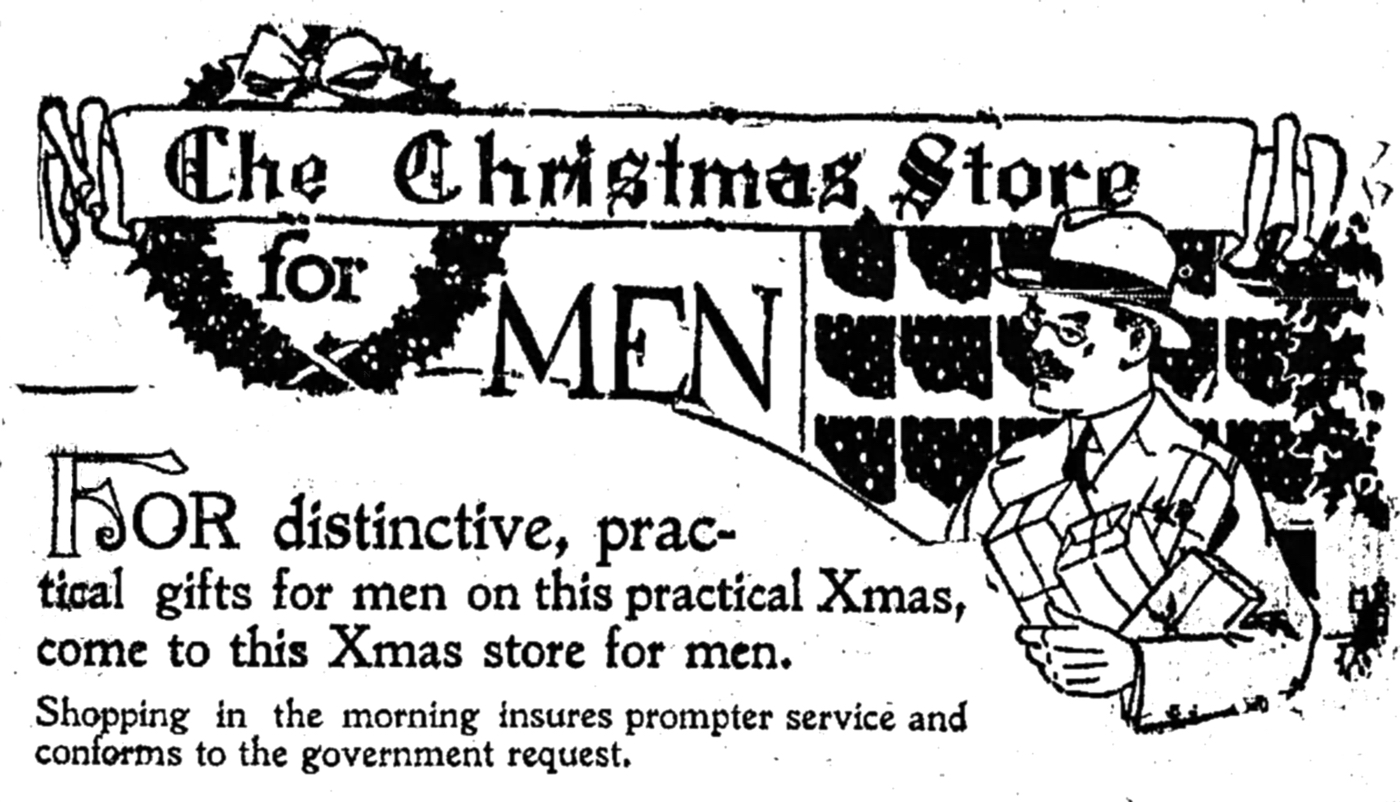
Advertising image of a man shopping for Christmas presents, United States, 1918

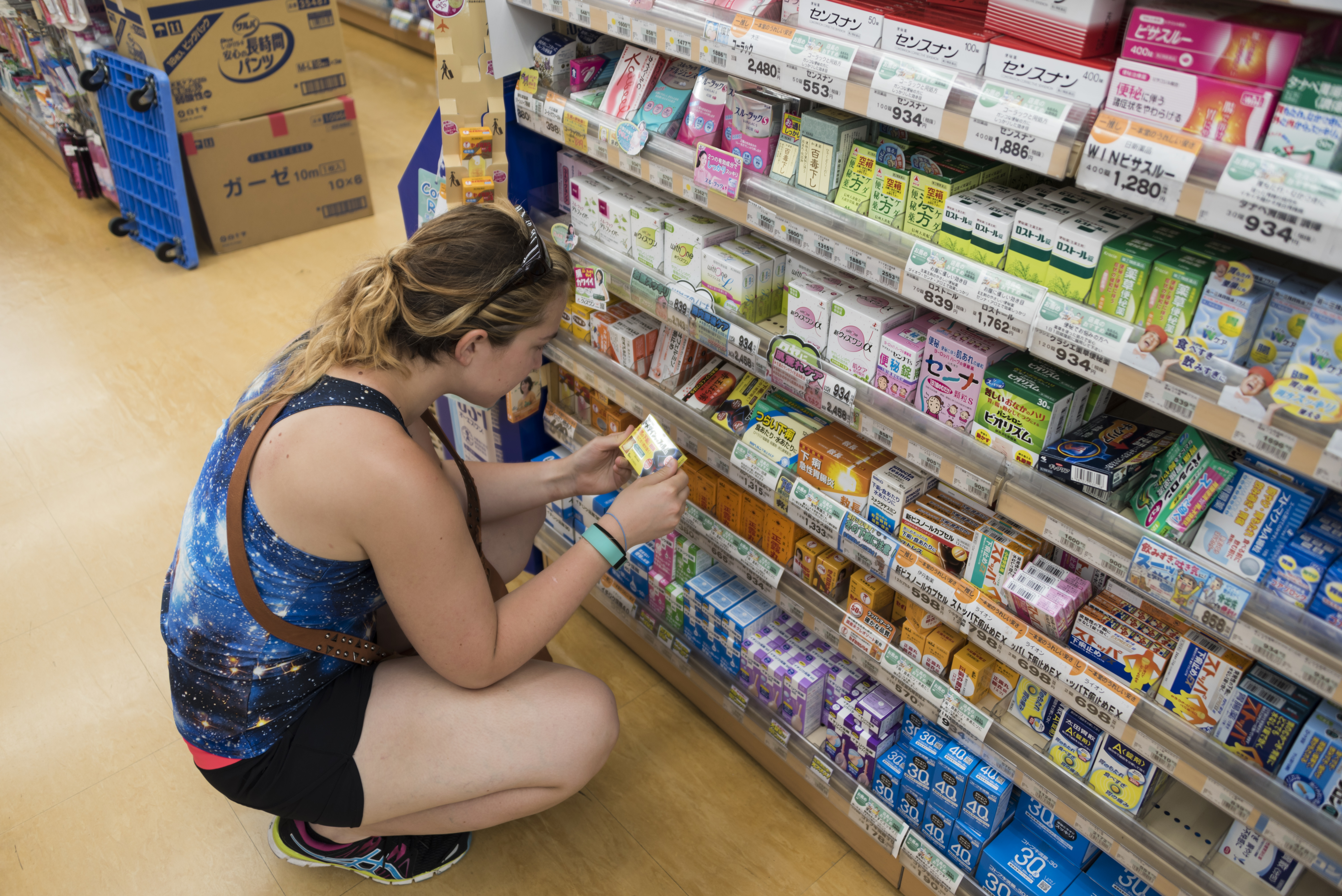
A woman shopping in Japan, 2016

Shopping is an activity in which a customer examines or looks for the available goods or services presented by one or more retailers with the potential intent to purchase a suitable selection of them or casually browses such items without actual intent to purchase. "Shopping" as a word in English is a gerund derived from Old English "sċoppa," meaning "shed," "booth," "stall," or "shop." (Compare "marketing," which may refer to the activity of shopping in a physical marketplace or of presenting and promoting items for sale.)

A retailer, shop, or store is a business that presents a selection of goods and offers to trade or sell them to customers for money or other goods. Traditionally, such businesses have been in physical spaces that required shoppers to travel to those locations. Technological advances over time have also made shopping possible through mail-order catalogues, telephone purchases, and online orders, among other media.

As an economic activity, shopping may be purposeful, where a shopper looks for items to fulfill specific wants or needs. Within a typology of shopper types developed by scholars another group may be "recreational shoppers," that is, those who enjoy shopping and view it as a leisure activity. Shopping may also itself be done for hire, from part-time jobs where a shopper is paid to purchase items on behalf of a client who cannot or does not wish to go to a store, to "personal shoppers" who may also advise and consult with clients about what products to buy, to "mystery" or "secret" shoppers who pose as store customers in order to evaluate the quality and nature of a business on behalf of that store's management or a rival business.

Online shopping has become a major disruptor in the retail industry as consumers can now search for product information and place product orders across different regions. Online retailers deliver their products directly to the consumers' home, offices, or wherever they want. The B2C (business to consumer) process has made it easy for consumers to select any product online from a retailer's website and to have it delivered relatively quickly. Consumers may also compare types and prices of individual products listed at individual websites or search for such comparisons on platforms such as Amazon.com or China's Alibaba. In this way, consumers do not need to consume energy by physically visiting physical stores, thus saving time and the cost of traveling.

Shoppers' shopping experiences may vary. They are based on a variety of factors including how the customer is treated, convenience, the type of goods being purchased, and mood.

== History ==
=== Antiquity ===
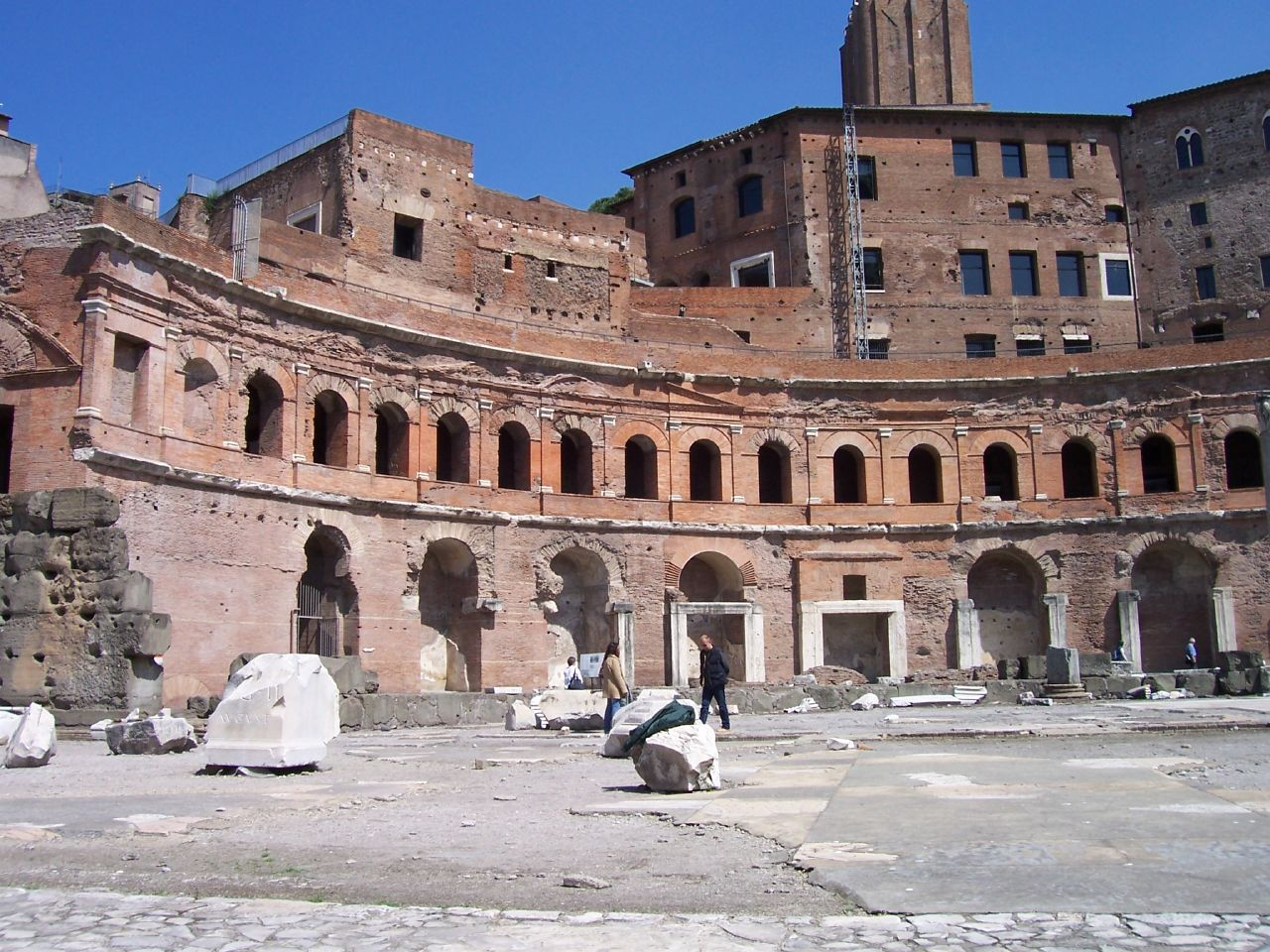
Remains of marketplace and retail shops at Trajan's Forum in Rome

In antiquity, marketplaces and fairs were established to facilitate the exchange of goods and services. People would shop for goods at a regular market in nearby towns. However, the transient nature of stalls and stall-holders meant the consumers needed to make careful inspection of goods prior to purchase. In ancient Greece, the agora served as a marketplace where merchants kept stalls or shops to sell their goods.

Ancient Rome utilized a similar marketplace known as the forum. Rome had two forums; the Forum Romanum and Trajan's Forum. Trajan's Market at Trajan's Forum, built around 100-110CE, was a vast expanse, comprising multiple buildings with tabernae that served as retail shops, situated on four levels. The Roman forum was arguably the earliest example of a permanent retail shopfront. In the Roman world, the central market primarily served the local peasantry. Those who lived on the great estates were sufficiently attractive for merchants to call directly at their farm-gates, obviating their need to attend local markets.

Shopping lists are known to have been used by Romans. One such list was discovered near Hadrian's Wall dated back to 75–125 CE and written for a soldier.

=== Middle Ages ===
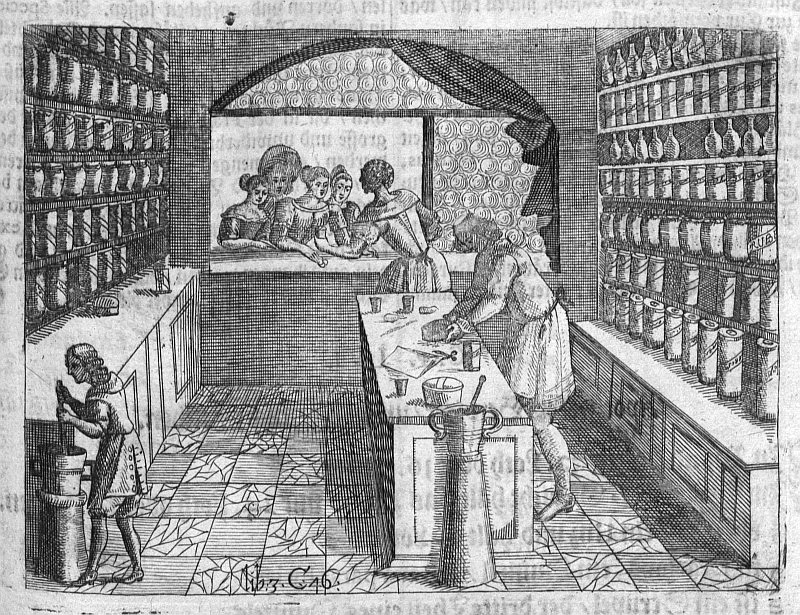
An early 17th-century shop, with customers being served through an opening onto the street

Archaeological evidence suggests that the British engaged in minimal shopping in the early Middle Ages. Instead, they provided for their basic needs through subsistence farming practices and a system of localised personal exchanges. However, by the late Middle Ages licensed market towns served as regional hubs for the purchase of fresh produce, meat and fish, and other goods. At periodic market fairs, non-perishables and luxury goods could be also be obtained. Women were responsible for everyday household purchases, but most of their purchasing was of a mundane nature. For the main part, shopping was seen as a chore rather than a pleasure. However, market towns and fairs also often provided entertainment and other occasions for social interaction. A few such historical venues have continued to function into the present day, but these traditions also continue in some places as "farmer's markets," while so-called Renaissance fairs maintain elements of such entertainment.

Relatively few permanent shops were to be found outside the most populous cities. Instead customers walked into the tradesman's workshops where they discussed purchasing options directly with tradesmen. Itinerant vendors such as costermongers, hucksters and peddlers operated alongside markets, providing the convenience of home delivery to households, and especially to geographically isolated communities.

In the more populous European cities, a small number of shops were beginning to emerge by the 13th century. Specialist retailers such as mercers and haberdashers were known to exist in London, while grocers sold "miscellaneous small wares as well as spices and medicines." However, these shops were primitive. As late as the 16th century, London's shops were described as little more than "rude booths."

The medieval shopper's experience was very different from that of the contemporary shopper. Store interiors were dark and shoppers had relatively few opportunities to inspect the merchandise prior to consumption. Glazed windows in retail environments were virtually unknown during the medieval period. Goods were rarely out on display; instead retailers kept the merchandise at the rear of the store and would only bring out items on request. The service counter was virtually unknown and instead, many stores had openings onto the street from which they served customers. The emergence of cash economies meant that shoppers would exchange physical currency for goods instead of offering items of equal value in exchange for products through bartering. Bargaining (or "haggling") between shoppers and vendors over prices, quantities, and values of goods is still common in street markets around the world and even persists in some ways in modern economies.

In Britain, medieval attitudes to retailing and shopping were negative. Retailers were no better than hucksters, because they simply resold goods, by buying cheaper and selling dearer, without adding value of national accounts. Added to this were concerns about the self-interest of retailers and some of their more unethical practices. Attitudes to spending on luxury goods also attracted criticism, since it involved importing goods which did little to stimulate national accounts, and interfered with the growth of worthy local manufacturers.

=== Shopping for pleasure ===
The modern phenomenon of shopping for pleasure is closely linked to the emergence of a middle class in the 17th and 18th-century Europe. As standards of living improved in the 17th century, consumers from a broad range of social backgrounds began to purchase goods that were in excess of basic necessities. An emergent middle class or bourgeoisie stimulated demand for luxury goods and began to purchase a wider range of luxury goods and imported goods, including: Indian cotton and calico; silk, tea and porcelain from China, spices from India and South-East Asia and tobacco, sugar, rum and coffee from the New World. The act of shopping came to be seen as a pleasurable pastime or form of entertainment.

By the 17th-century, produce markets gradually gave way to shops and shopping centres, which changed the consumer's shopping experience. In London, the New Exchange, opened in 1609 by Robert Cecil in the Strand was one such example of a planned shopping centre. Shops started to become important as places for Londoners to meet and socialise and became popular destinations alongside the theatre. Restoration London also saw the growth of luxury buildings as advertisements for social position with speculative architects like Nicholas Barbon and Lionel Cranfield.

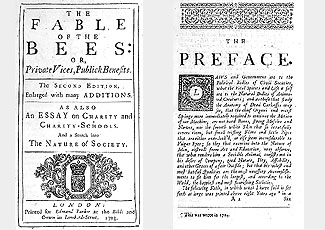
Bernard Mandeville's work The Fable of the Bees, which justified conspicuous consumption.

Much pamphleteering of the time was devoted to justifying conspicuous consumption and private vice for luxury goods for the greater public good. This then-scandalous line of thought caused great controversy with the publication of Bernard Mandeville's influential work Fable of the Bees in 1714, in which he argued that a country's prosperity ultimately lay in the self-interest of the consumer.

These trends gathered momentum in the 18th century, as rising prosperity and social mobility increased the number of people with disposable income for consumption. Important shifts included the marketing of goods for individuals as opposed to items for the household, and the new status of goods as status symbols, related to changes in fashion and desired for aesthetic appeal, as opposed to just their utility. The pottery inventor and entrepreneur Josiah Wedgewood pioneered the use of marketing techniques to influence and manipulate the direction of the prevailing tastes. One of his preferred sales techniques was to stage expansive showcases of wares in his private residences or in a rented hall, to which he invited the upper classes.

As the 18th-century progressed, a wide variety of goods and manufactures were steadily made available for the urban middle and upper classes. This growth in consumption led to the rise of 'shopping' - a proliferation of retail shops selling particular goods and the acceptance of shopping as a cultural activity in its own right. Specific streets and districts became devoted to retail, including the Strand and Piccadilly in London.

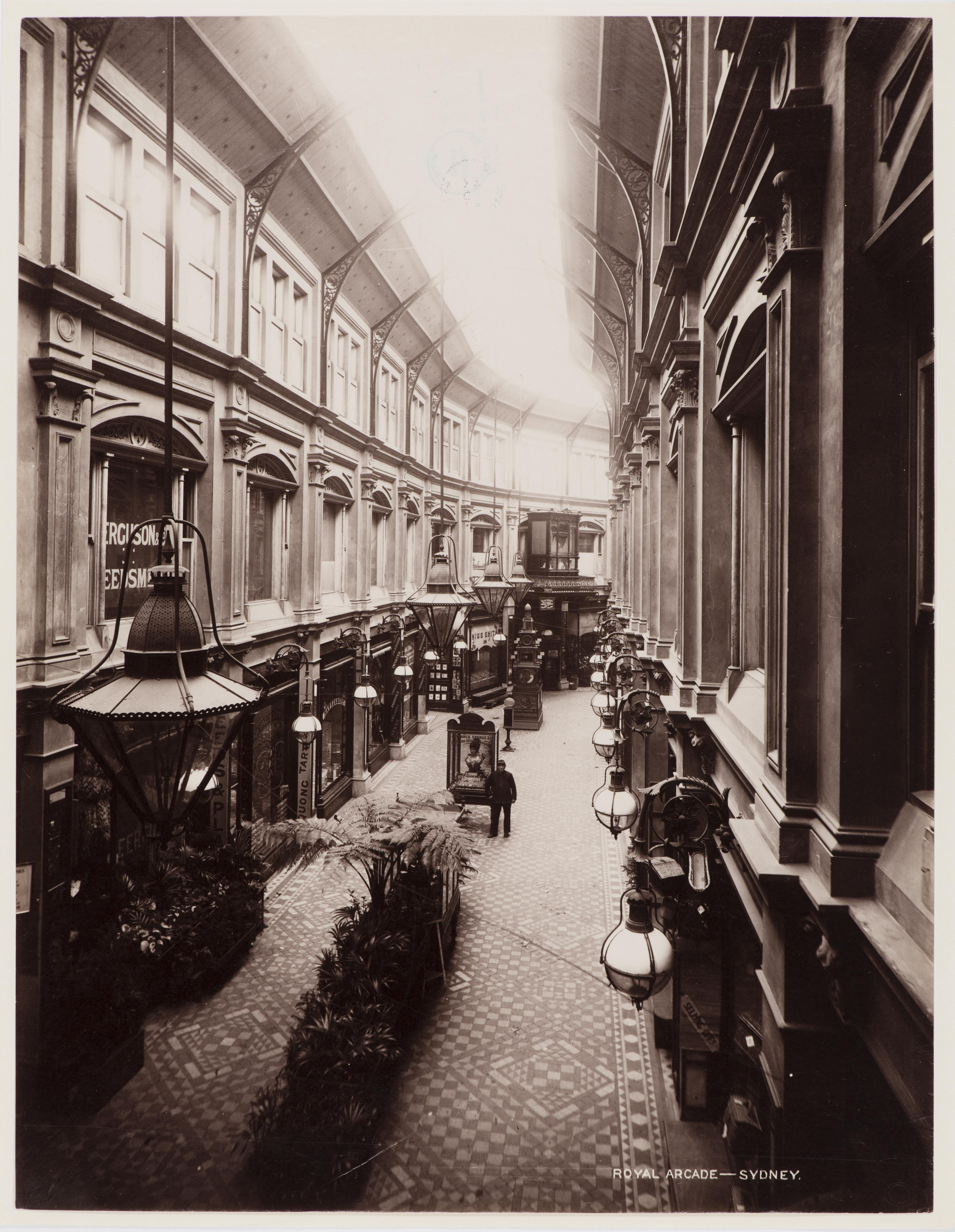
Royal Arcade, Sydney, 1892

The rise of window shopping (a form of "browsing") as a recreational activity accompanied the use of glass windows in retail shop-fronts. By the late eighteenth century, grand shopping arcades began to emerge across Britain, Europe and in the Antipodes in what became known as the "arcade era." Typically, these arcades had a roof constructed of glass to allow for natural light and to reduce the need for candles or electric lighting. Inside the arcade, individual stores were fitted with long glass exterior windows which allowed the emerging middle-classes to window shop and indulge in fantasies, even when they may not have been able to afford the high retail prices.

Designed to attract the genteel middle class, retailers sold luxury goods at relatively high prices. However, prices were never a deterrent, as these new arcades came to be the place to shop and to be seen. Arcades offered shoppers the promise of an enclosed space away from the chaos of daily street life, a place shoppers could socialise and spend their leisure time. As thousands of glass covered arcades spread across Europe, they became grander and more ornately decorated. By the mid nineteenth century, promenading in these arcades became a popular pastime for the emerging middle classes.

In Europe, the Palais-Royal, which opened in 1784, became one of the earliest examples of the new style of shopping arcade, frequented by both the aristocracy and the middle classes. It developed a reputation as being a site of sophisticated conversation, revolving around the salons, cafés, and bookshops, but also became a place frequented by off-duty soldiers and was a favourite haunt of prostitutes, many of whom rented apartments in the building. In London, one of the first to use display windows in shops was retailer Francis Place, who experimented with this new retailing method at his tailoring establishment in Charing Cross, where he fitted the shop-front with large plate glass windows. Although this was condemned by many, he defended his practice in his memoirs, claiming that he:

sold from the window more goods...than paid journeymen's wages and the expenses of housekeeping.

Retailers designed attractive shop fronts to entice patronage, using bright lights, advertisements and attractively arranged goods. The goods on offer were in a constant state of change, due to the frenetic change in fashions. A foreign visitor commented that London was "a world of gold and silver plate, then pearls and gems shedding their dazzling lustre, home manufactures of the most exquisite taste, an ocean of rings, watches, chains, bracelets, perfumes, ready-dresses, ribbons, lace, bonnets, and fruits from all the zones of the habitable world".

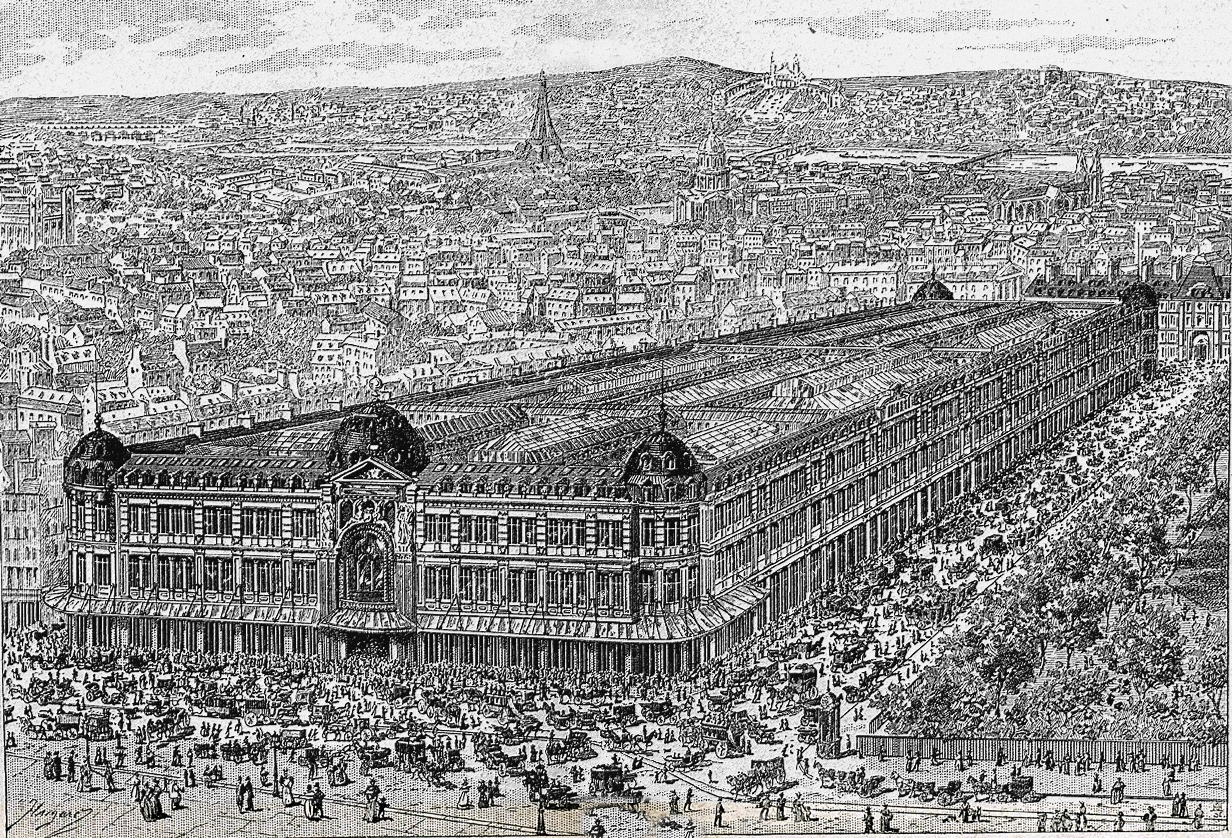
Le Bon Marché, founded in Paris, offered a wide variety of goods in "departments" inside one building, from 1851.

=== Evolution of stores: from arcades to department stores ===
In the second half of the 19th century, shops transitioned from 'single-function' shops selling one type of good, to the department store where a large variety of goods were sold. As economic growth, fueled by the Industrial Revolution at the turn of the 19th-century, steadily expanded, the affluent bourgeois middle-class grew in size and wealth. This urbanized social group was the catalyst for the emergence of the retail revolution of the period.

The term, "department store" originated in the United States. In 19th century England, these stores were known as "emporia" or "warehouse shops". A number of major department stores opened across the US, Britain and Europe from the mid nineteenth century including; Harrod's of London in 1834; Kendall's in Manchester in 1836; Selfridges of London in 1909; Macy's of New York in 1858; Bloomingdale's in 1861; Sak's in 1867; J.C. Penney in 1902; Le Bon Marché of France in 1852 and Galeries Lafayette of France in 1905.

The first reliably dated department store to be established was Harding, Howell & Co, which opened in 1796 on Pall Mall, London. This venture was described as being a public retail establishment offering a wide range of consumer goods in different departments. This pioneering shop was closed down in 1820 when the business partnership was dissolved. Department stores were established on a large scale from the 1840s and 50s, in France, the United Kingdom and the US. French retailer, Le Bon Marche, is an example of a department store that has survived into current times Originally founded in 1838 as a lace and haberdashery store, it was revamped mid-century and opened as a department store in 1852.

Many of the early department stores were more than just a retail emporium; rather they were venues where shoppers could spend their leisure time and be entertained. Some department stores offered reading rooms, art galleries and concerts. Most department stores had tea-rooms or dining rooms and offered treatment areas where ladies could indulge in a manicure. The fashion show, which originated in the US in around 1907, became a staple feature event for many department stores and celebrity appearances were also used to great effect. Themed events featured wares from foreign shores, exposing shoppers to the exotic cultures of the Orient and Middle-East.

== Shopping venues ==
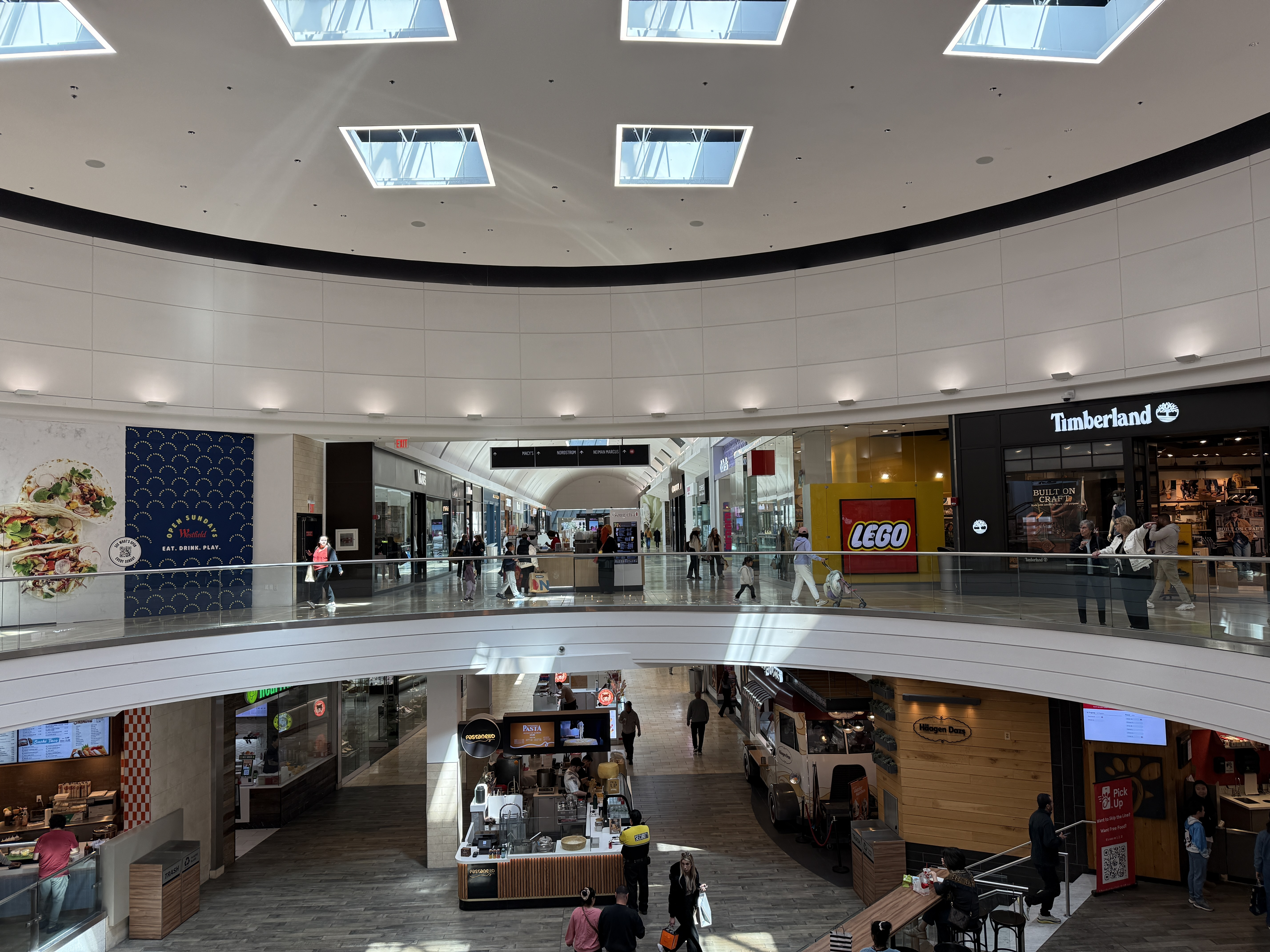
Westfield Garden State Plaza

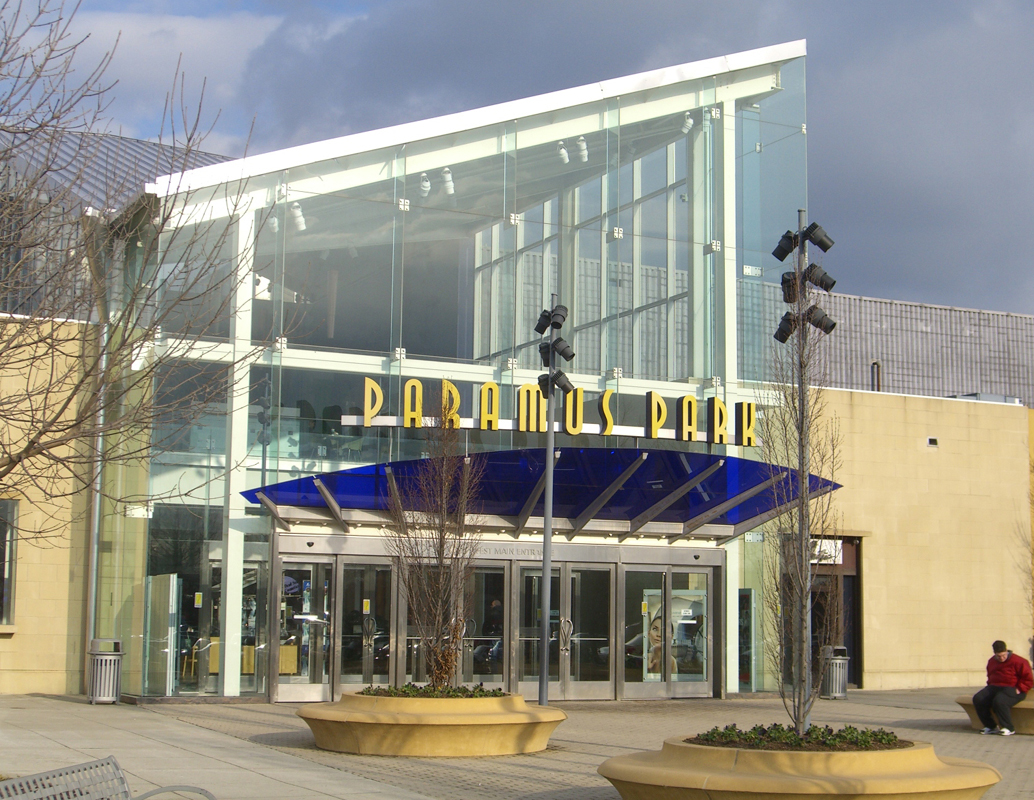
Paramus Park

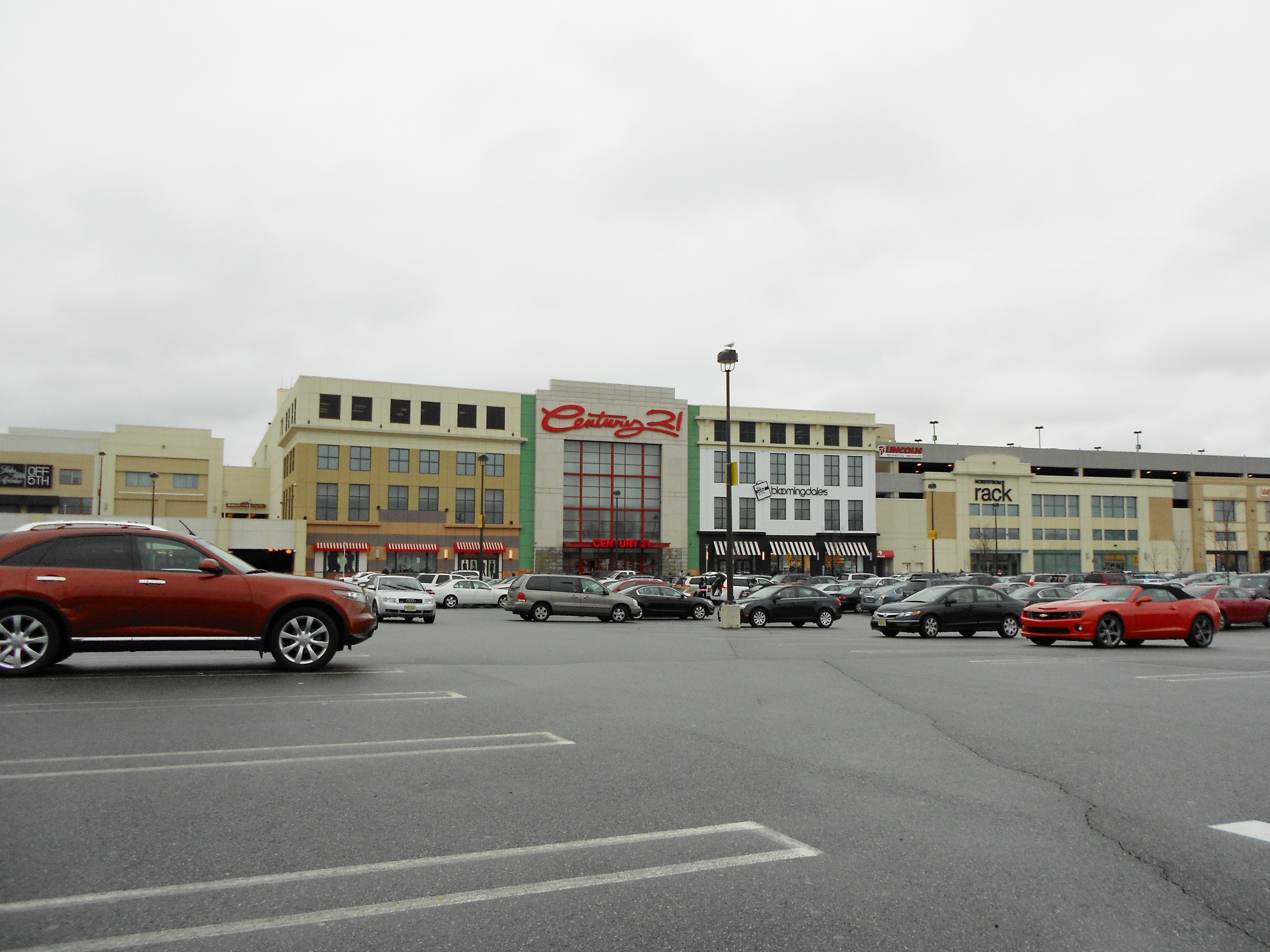
Bergen Town Center

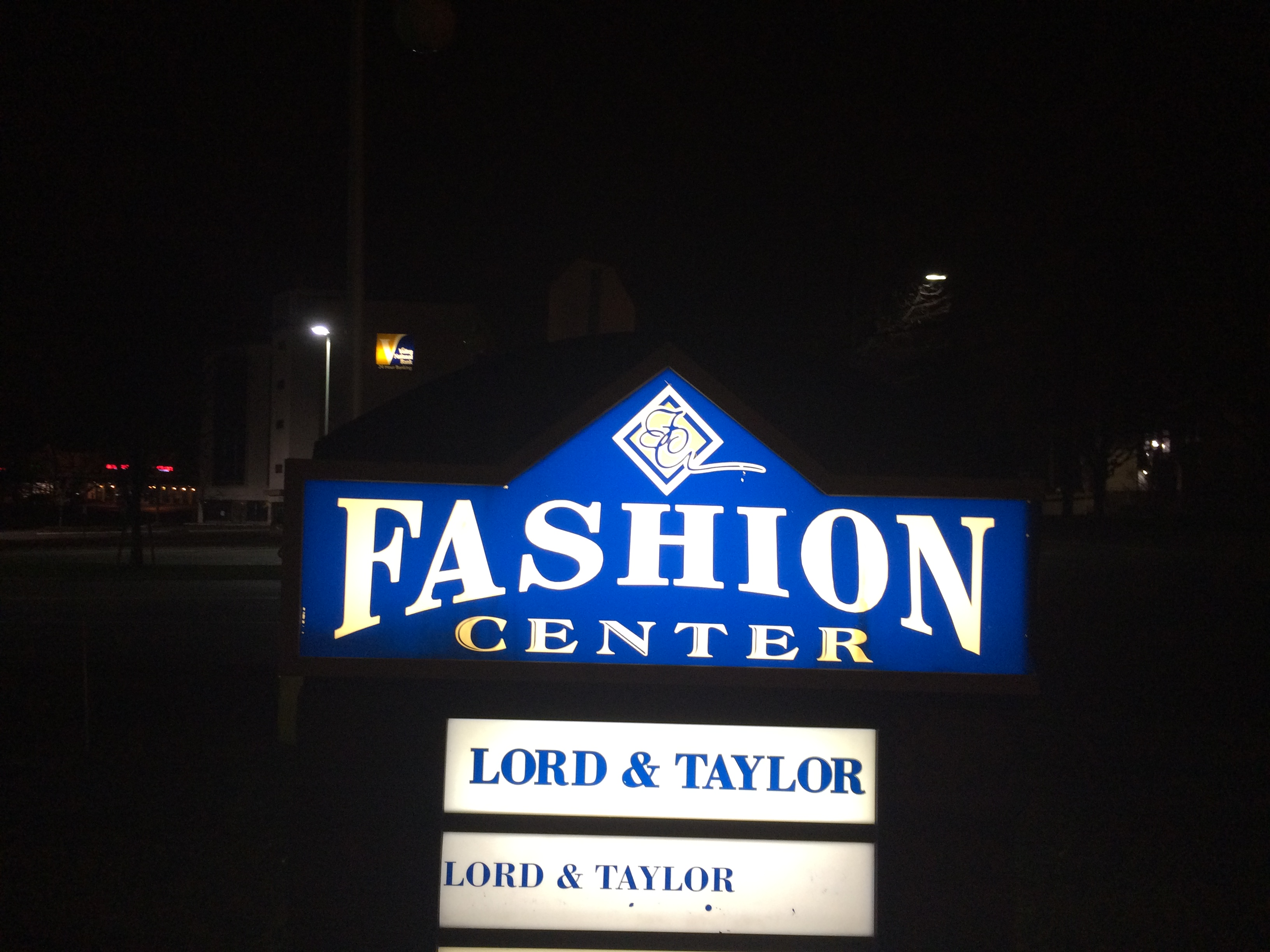
Fashion Center. Four different shopping malls near New York City in Paramus, Bergen County, New Jersey, U.S., the top American retailing hub with $6 billion in sales annually. Each mall employs a different retail strategy to grow and thrive.

=== Shopping hubs ===
A larger commercial zone can be found in many cities, more formally called a central business district, but more commonly called "downtown" in the United States, or the "high street" in Britain, and souks in Arabic speaking areas.

Shopping hubs, or shopping centers, are collections of stores; that is a grouping of several businesses in a compact geographic area. It consists of a collection of retail, entertainment and service stores designed to serve products and services to the surrounding region. Typical examples include shopping malls, town squares, flea markets and bazaars.

Traditionally, shopping hubs were called bazaars or marketplaces, an assortment of stalls lining streets selling a large variety of goods.

The modern shopping centre is now different from its antecedents; the stores are commonly in individual buildings or compressed into one large structure (usually called Mall in the USA). These usually offer free parking areas and are located in suburban districts.

The first modern shopping mall in the US was The Country Club Plaza in Kansas City which opened in 1922; from there the first enclosed mall was designed by Victor Gruen and opened in 1956 as Southdale Centre in Edina, Minnesota, a suburb of Minneapolis.

Malls peaked in America in the 1980s-1990s when many larger malls (more than 37,000 sq m in size) were built, attracting consumers from within a 32 km radius with their luxurious department stores.

Different types of malls can be found around the world. Superregional malls are very large malls that contain at least five department stores and 300 shops. This type of mall attracts consumers from a broad radius (up to a 160-km). A regional mall can contain at least two department stores or "anchor stores". One of the biggest malls in the world is the one near Miami, called "Sawgrass Mills Mall": it has 2,370,610 square feet (220,237 m2) of retail selling space, with over 329 retail outlets and name brand discounters. In North America, other such "mega-malls" include the West Edmonton Mall in Edmonton, Canada and the Mall of America in Bloomington, Minnesota.

The smaller malls are often called open-air strip centres or mini-marts and are typically attached to a grocery store or supermarket. American "strip malls" or "mini-malls" and British "retail parks" are smaller in total size and have less variety of retail venues, but may also feature professional offices, restaurants, and so on.

The smaller malls are less likely to include the same features of a large mall such as an indoor concourse, but are beginning to evolve to become enclosed to comply with all weather and customer preferences.

=== Stores ===
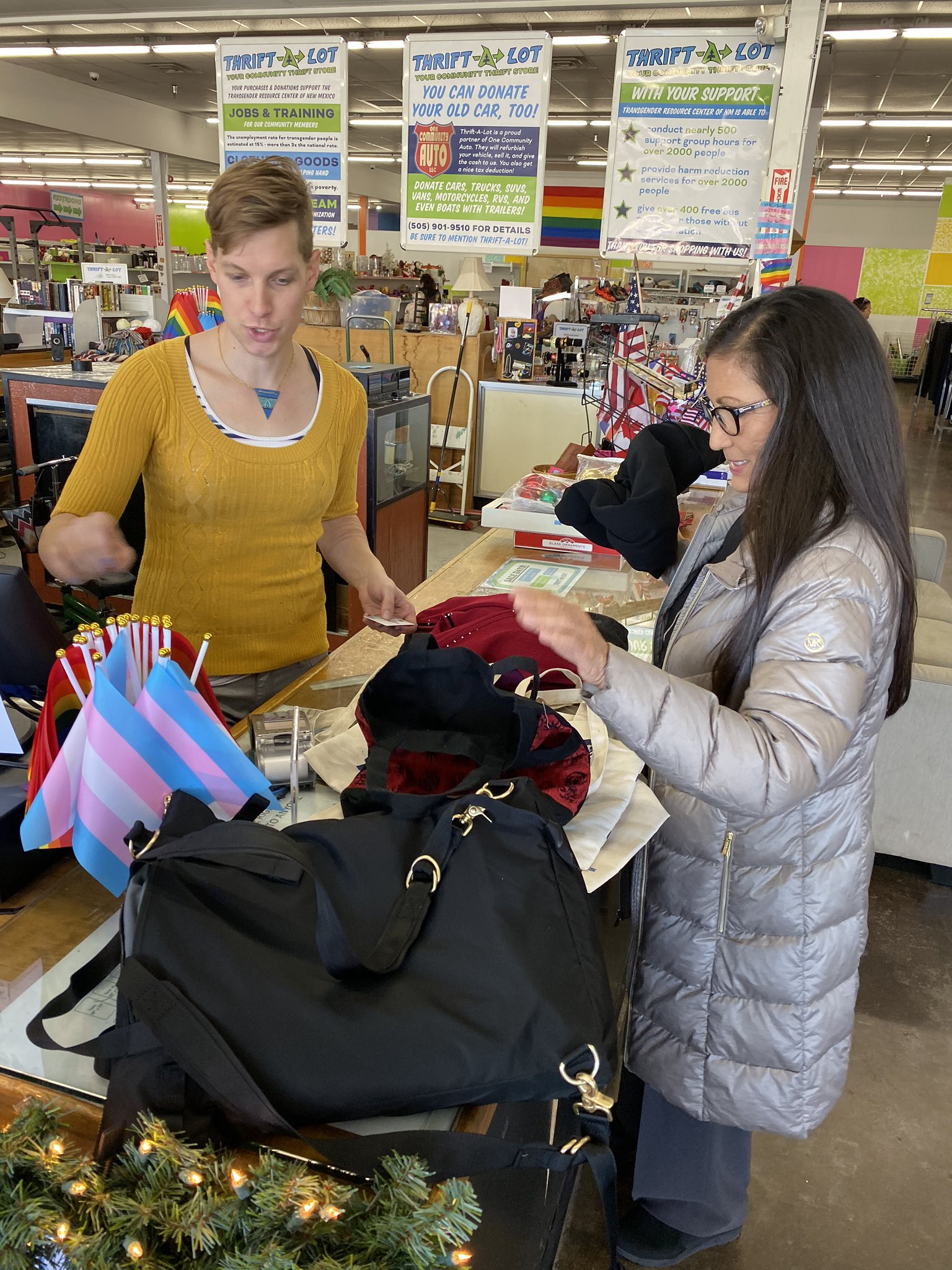
Deb Haaland shopping at a thrift store in Albuquerque, New Mexico in 2019.

Stores are divided into multiple categories of stores which sell a selected set of goods or services. Usually they are tiered by target demographics based on the disposable income of the shopper. They can be tiered from cheap to pricey.

Some shops sell secondhand goods. Often the public can also sell goods to such shops. In other cases, especially in the case of a nonprofit shop, the public donates goods to these shops, commonly known as thrift stores in the United States, charity shops in the United Kingdom, or op shops in Australia and New Zealand. In give-away shops goods can be taken for free. In antique shops, the public can find goods that are older and harder to find. Sometimes people are broke and borrow money from a pawn shop using an item of value as collateral. College students are known to resell books back through college textbook bookstores. Old used items are often distributed through surplus stores.

Various types of retail stores that specialize in the selling of goods related to a theme include bookstores, boutiques, candy shops, liquor stores, gift shops, hardware stores, hobby stores, pet stores, pharmacies, sex shops and supermarkets.

Other stores such as big-box stores, hypermarkets, convenience stores, department stores, general stores, dollar stores sell a wider variety of products not horizontally related to each other.

==== Home shopping ====
Home mail delivery systems and modern technology (such as television, telephones, and the Internet), in combination with electronic commerce, allow consumers to shop from home. There are three main types of home shopping: mail or telephone ordering from catalogs; telephone ordering in response to advertisements in print and electronic media (such as periodicals, TV and radio); and online shopping. Online shopping has completely redefined the way people make their buying decisions; the Internet provides access to a lot of information about a particular product, which can be looked at, evaluated, and comparison-priced at any given time. Online shopping allows the buyer to save the time and expense, which would have been spent traveling to the store or mall. According to technology and research firm Forrester, mobile purchases or mcommerce will account for 49% of ecommerce, or $252 billion in sales, by 2020

==== Neighborhood shopping ====
Convenience stores are common in North America, and are often called "bodegas" in Spanish-speaking communities or "dépanneurs" in French-speaking ones. Sometimes peddlers and ice cream trucks pass through neighborhoods offering goods and services. Also, garage sales are a common form of second hand resale.

Neighbourhood shopping areas and retailers give value to a community by providing various social and community services (like a library), and a social place to meet. Neighbourhood retailing differs from other types of retailers such as destination retailers because of the difference in offered products and services, location and popularity. Neighbourhood retailers include stores such as; Food shops/marts, dairies, Pharmacies, Dry cleaners, Hairdressers/barbers, Bottle shops, Cafés and take-away shops. Destination retailers include stores such as; Gift shops, Antique shops, Pet groomers, Engravers, Tattoo parlour, Bicycle shops, Herbal dispensary clinics, Art galleries, Office Supplies and framers. The neighbourhood retailers sell essential goods and services to the residential area they are located in. There can be many groups of neighbourhood retailers in different areas of a region or city, but destination retailers are often part of shopping malls where the numbers of consumers is higher than that of a neighbourhood retail area. The destination retailers are becoming more prevalent as they can provide a community with more than the essentials, they offer an experience, and a wider scope of goods and services.

==== Party shopping ====
The party plan is a method of marketing products by hosting a social event, using the event to display and demonstrate the product or products to those gathered, and then to take orders for the products before the gathering ends.

== Shopping activity ==
=== Shopping seasons ===
Shopping frenzies are periods of time where a burst of spending occurs, typically near holidays in the United States, with Christmas shopping being the biggest shopping spending season, starting as early as October and continuing until after Christmas.

Some religions regard such spending seasons as being against their faith and dismiss the practice. Many contest the over-commercialization and the response by stores that downplay the shopping season, often cited in the War on Christmas.

The National Retail Federation (NRF) also highlights the importance of back-to-school shopping for retailers, which comes second behind holiday shopping, when buyers often buy clothing and school supplies for their children. In 2017, Americans spent over $83 billion on back-to-school and back-to-college shopping, according to the NRF annual survey.

Seasonal shopping consists of buying the appropriate clothing for the particular season. In winter, people bundle up in warm layers and coats to keep warm, while in summer, people wear less clothing to stay cooler in the heat. Seasonal shopping now revolves a lot around holiday sales and buying more for less. Stores need to get rid of all of their previous seasonal clothing to make room for the new trends of the upcoming season. The end-of-season sales usually last a few weeks, with prices lowering further towards the closing of the sale. During sales, items can be discounted from 10% up to as much as 50%, with the biggest reduction in sales occurring at the end of the season. Holiday shopping periods are extending their sales further and further, with holidays such as Black Friday becoming a month-long event, stretching promotions across November. These days, shopping doesn't stop once the mall closes, as people have more access to stores and their sales than ever before with the help of the Internet and apps. Today many people research their purchases online to find the cheapest and best deal with one third of all shopping searches on Google happen between 10:00 pm and 4:00 am. Shoppers are now spending more time consulting different sources before making a final purchasing decision. Shoppers once used an average of five sources for information before making a purchase, but numbers have risen to as high as 12 sources in 2014.

=== Spree shopping ===
Spree shopping, or 'going on a shopping spree', is an individual period of intense and indulgent shopping involving many purchases, which differs from both normal shopping and compulsive shopping in its scope and purpose. One study reportedly showed that the pleasure centers of the brain were stimulated during a shopping spree similarly to the stimulation experienced during sexual activity. A shopping spree may be "especially problematic for those whose immediate release of tension is followed by subsequent feelings of guilt, sadness, anger, or despair over what turned out to be an unwanted purchase".

== Pricing and negotiation ==
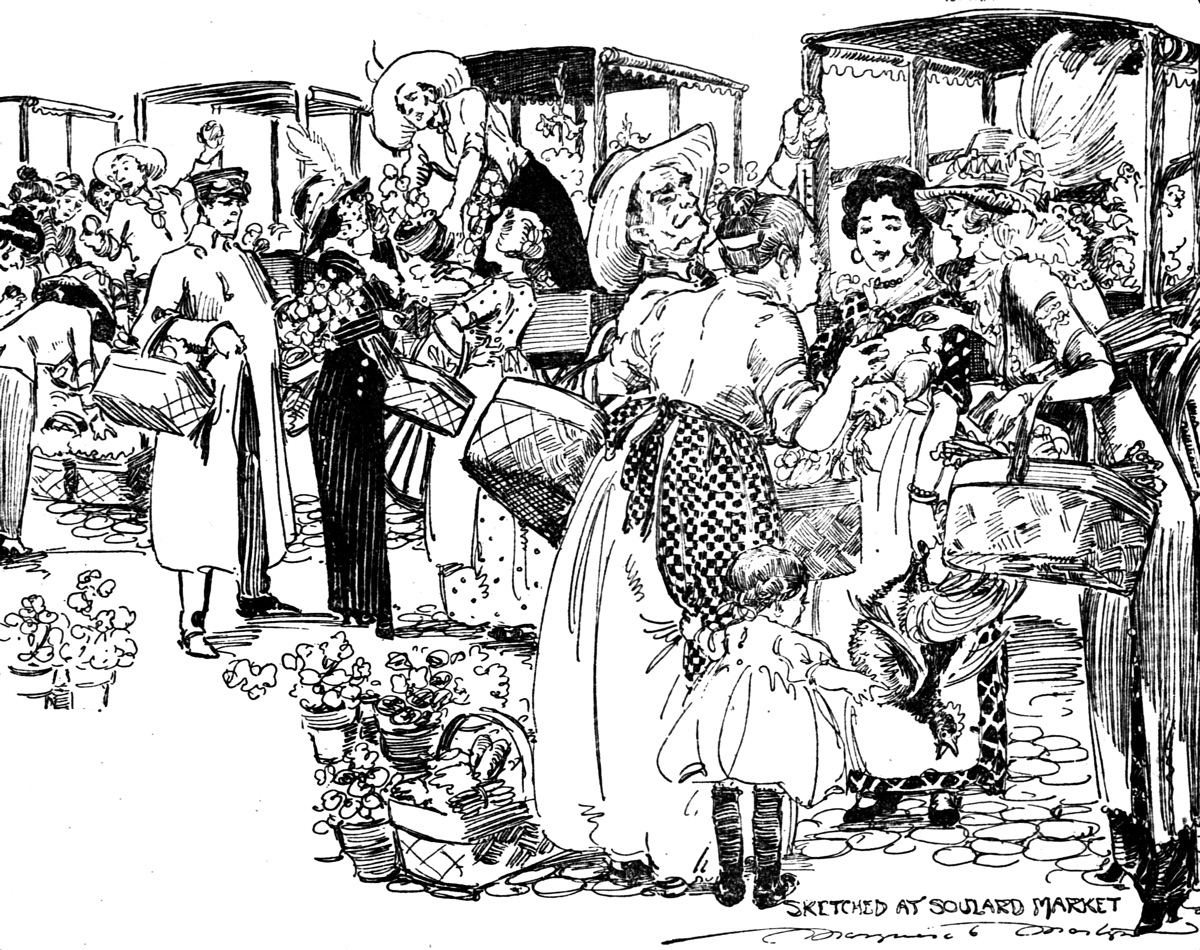
Sales being made at Soulard Market, St. Louis, Missouri, drawing by Marguerite Martyn, 1912

Historically, prices were established through a system of barter or negotiation. The first retailer to adopt fixed prices is thought to be the retailers operating out of the Palais-Royal complex in the 18th-century. These retailers adopted a system of high price maintenance in order to cultivate images of luxury. For their upper class clientele, fixed prices spared them from hassle of bartering.

The pricing technique used by most retailers is cost-plus pricing. This involves adding a markup amount (or percentage) to the retailers' cost. Another common technique is manufacturers suggested list pricing. This simply involves charging the amount suggested by the manufacturer and usually printed on the product by the manufacturer.

In retail settings, psychological pricing or odd-number pricing are both widely used. Psychological pricing which refers to a range of tactics, designed to have a positive psychological impact. For example, price tags using the terminal digit "9" (e.g., 9.99, 19.99, or 199.99) can be used to signal price points and bring an item in at just under the consumer's reservation price. However, in Chinese societies, prices are generally either a round number or sometimes some lucky number. This creates price points.

In a fixed-price system, consumers may still use bargaining or haggling; a negotiation about the price. Economists see this as determining how the transaction's total economic surplus will be divided between consumers and producers. Neither party has a clear advantage because the threat of no sale exists, in which case the surplus would vanish for both.

When shopping online, it can be more difficult to negotiate price given that you are not directly interacting with a sales person. Some consumers use price comparison services to locate the best price and/or to make a decision about who or where to buy from to save money.

=== "Window shopping" ===
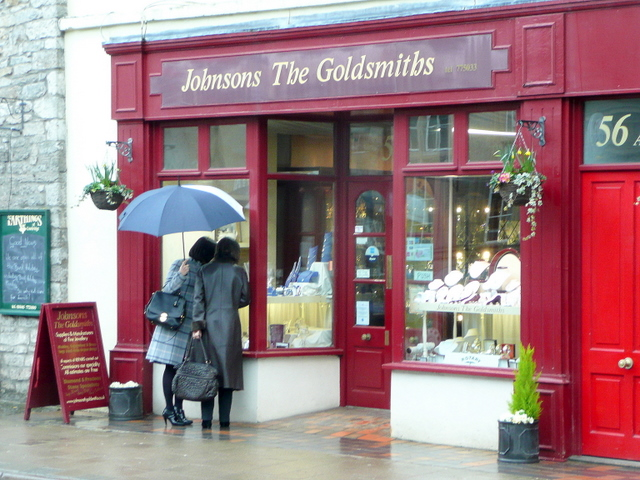
Window shopping in the rain

"Window shopping" is a term referring to the browsing of goods by a consumer with or without the intent to purchase. Window shopping is often practised by a particular segment, known as the recreation-conscious or hedonistic shopper. Recreational shopping is characterised by the consumer's engagement in the purchase process, and recreational shoppers are those consumers who see the act of shopping as a form of enjoyment. Other consumers use window shopping as part of their planning activity for a later purchase.

Showrooming, the practice of examining merchandise in a traditional retail store without purchasing it, but then shopping online to find a lower price for the same item, has become an increasingly prevalent problem for traditional retailers as a result of online competitors, so much so that some have begun to take measures to combat it.

== Utility cycling ==
In countries like Denmark, the Netherlands and Germany the high levels of utility cycling also includes shopping trips e.g. 9% of all shopping trips in Germany are by bicycle.

== See also ==
- Price comparison service (Internet shopping)
- Marketing
- Retail
- Retailing
- Selling
- Trade
- Window shopping
