= ShoppyBag =

Internet phishing scam

ShoppyBag was an Internet phishing scam that harvested personal information such as e-mail addresses.

The scam was presented as a social network dedicated to shopping. People who created a ShoppyBag user account were deceived into giving the service permission to access their Gmail contacts list. The members of that contact list then received e-mails from ShoppyBag which stated that the person who owns the contact list "tagged you with a photo". To view the alleged photograph, the recipients had to click on a hyperlink that led them to a web page on which they were required to create a user account of their own. If they did so, they gave the operators of the scam access to their own Gmail contacts list, and the scam was repeated with these persons.

As of September 2011, the "shoppybag.com" website read that "ShoppyBag ceased all operations on July 31st, 2011."
