= WordUp (program) =

Word processor program for Atari ST computers

- Original authors: Shelby Moore, Mike Fulton
- Developer: Neocept
- Initial release: 1988
- Final release: 3.0 / 1990
- Operating system: Atari TOS
- Type: Word Processor
- License: Proprietary

WordUp is a word processor for the Atari ST platform released by Neocept in 1988. It was one of the first word processors on the platform to offer a true what you see is what you get (WYSIWYG) display, using GDOS to work with multiple fonts and embedded graphics. Most previous word processors on the platform were either entirely text-based, like Atari's own ST Writer, or did not use GDOS and did not support multiple fonts and effects on-screen.

Overall, the program was relatively simple, similar to MacWrite. It did offer some more powerful features like the ability to generate a glossary and good control over typography. Reviews were generally positive, especially over its ability to easily perform layout and editing in rich documents, but the lack of a spell checker and the very slow printing was a notable concern in most reviews.

== Description ==
=== GDOS ===
The Graphics Environment Manager, or GEM, formed the basis of the Atari ST's graphical user interface (GUI). GEM included a system known as GDOS, short for Graphics Device Operating System, which was designed to virtualize graphics output in the same fashion that CP/Ms BDOS allowed different input/output devices to be virtualized. This meant that graphics generated for one device could be sent to any other GDOS device, for instance, from the screen to a printer. GDOS introduced significant overhead which noticeably effected the speed of all applications on the system, not just those using it.

For performance reasons, few word processors on the ST made use of GDOS and instead called the underlying graphics routines directly. This meant they lacked the features like multiple fonts and WYSIWYG layout that would be seen on the Macintosh even in simple programs like MacWrite. Their GUIs were limited to issuing commands through the menu system and interaction using dialog boxes. Among the most popular word processors on the ST was Atari's own ST Writer, which took this to its extreme and removed any GUI at all, opening in a pure text mode and using control keys for all interaction. In all of these cases, output was performed by sending ASCII and printer control characters, such that output appeared in whatever modes the attached printer supported.

=== WordUp ===
WordUp was among the few, and first, (commercial) programs that did make use of GDOS on the ST. This allowed it to make full use of the underlying GEM system, providing multiple fonts in a single document. Three standard GDOS fonts were included in the base package, Dutch and Swiss proportionally spaced fonts, and Courier (sometimes known as Typewriter), a monospaced font. Neocept also offered a companion program, Fontz, to modify these or create new ones. Typography offered fine control like how high superscripts should be and various forms of underlying and similar effects.

The downside to offering these features was that performance was effected. Scrolling was notably slower than on non-GDOS programs, but was considered usable. Printing, which was performed as bitmap output, was significantly slower. They also offered an ASCII-only output for higher performance, which was useful for printing drafts. On a laser printer, output was considered excellent, and the program's manual was produced in this fashion.

The program opened with a single window, but up to four documents could be opened at once. The windows contained a ruler across the top of the document showing margins and tabs. Below the document windows was a separate section showing the function key bindings and additional buttons for setting tabs. These are similar to the buttons seen in 1st Word Plus. It also included the ability to crop and resize images without leaving the program. It supported DEGAS, NEOchrome and GEM IMG files, automatically flowing text around them.

The program did include a mail merge feature, but lacked a spell checker, which was considered a major oversight. (This section needs to edited to reflect the information I (Shelby Moore) provided in the Talk section. Version 3.0 added a massive spell checker, thesaurus, multiple columns, auto-hyphenation, etc) Its glossary function was typically used more like a macro, allowing a short bit of text to be expanded out on command. Various layout settings could be saved to master pages, allowing a document to have several sections with different layouts and then easily reproduce those layouts in other areas. Other notable features were the powerful search and replace, which among other things allowed searches on styles, and a variety of easy ways to select sentences and paragraphs.

The program also included a basic set of disk utility functions, including the ability to format a disk, check free space and delete or rename files.

== Reception ==
In the first issue of what was then ST/Amiga Format, Ben Taylor reviewed a wide array of word processors on both the Atari ST and Amiga. WordUp received very high marks for every category, except performance which got 2 out of 5. He also points out that the quality of printing on common 9-pin printers was not very good, stating that "if you use a laser printer, WordUp will produce excellent results... [but] at the moment it's a case of 'nice screen, shame about the print.'"

David Plotkin reviewed a number of word processors in the September 1988 edition of ST-Log. He concludes that "WordUp is not as fast as Word Writer, but the multiple faces/point sizes and ability to import graphics makes it ideal for writing which must include pictures. Be prepared for the very slow output." Plotkin wrote a second review dedicated to WordUp in the March 1989 edition. Its opening statement summarizes his entire review: "WordUp is a powerful word processor for the Atari ST that utilizes GDOS to produce high-quality printed output, as well as multiple sizes and typefaces, both on the screen and in print. It has many features not found in other word processors in its price range, although it does not have all the features of WordPerfect." He notes a few missing features, like table of contents and index generation, and points out "that the scrolling speed is quite slow. It is not so slow that it is unusable, but scrolling over long distances can be cumbersome."

In a November 1990 comparison review, ST Format (Note: ST/Amiga Format separated into ST Format and Amiga Format in 1989.) referred to WordUp as "the cheapest and oldest of graphic output WPs". They praised its simplicity and the end results when printed on a good printer, either a laser or 24-pin dot matrix printer. They complain about its slow scrolling, which made it hard to use on large documents, but conclude "it's a fine, cheap WP for letters and reports." In spite of this mixed review, it receives a 79% overall rating.

A major review in STart's May 1990 edition covered the release of Version 2.0. It opens by noting WordUp was "the first word processor for the ST to marry text and graphics in a true WYSIWYG (what you see is what you get) environment" and then pointing out the improvements for 2.0 that included GEM metafiles (a vector graphics format), outdents, the ability to add accents to characters, and scaling fonts from the smaller set of sizes provided in the GDOS font files. But most importantly, "overall speed has been significantly boosted", support for 24-pin printers was added, and code improvements freed up 40 kB of RAM. He concludes, "Overall, I am pleased with WordUp... and have no hesitation recommending the current version."
