= AtariWriter =

Word processor for Atari 8-bit computers

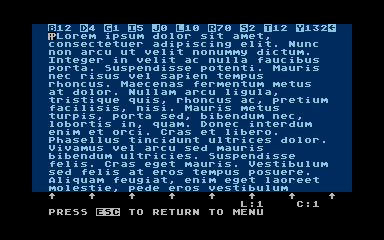
- Editing "Lorem Ipsum"
- Original author: William Robinson
- Developer: Atari, Inc.
- Release: 1982; 44 years ago (Note: 1982 is the copyright date, but sales did not start until the spring of 1983.)
- Final release: Version C / 1983; 43 years ago
- Written in: Assembly
- Platform: Atari 8-bit computers
- Size: 16 kB
- Type: Word processor
- License: Proprietary software

AtariWriter is a word processor for the Atari 8-bit computers released by Atari, Inc. as a 16 kB ROM cartridge in 1983. The program was fast and easy to use, while still having enough features to allow the creation of complex documents. With at least 800,000 units sold, not including international versions and later updates, it was among the company's most successful software products, and among the best selling word processors on any platform at the time.

Atari introduced Atari Word Processor, its first branded word processor, in 1981. Reviews unanimously praised its features but also noted its usability problems, including its difficult user interface and demanding system requirements. When the new models of the computers were introduced, the XL series, Word Processor was abandoned in favour of a simpler program that would run on any machine. William Robinson, author of Datasoft's Text Wizard, was hired for the new software project, with him modifying the program to run from a cartridge.

Positive reviews followed its release, with concerns also raised about the lack of mail merge and a spell checker, and the absence of printer drivers for any printers other than Atari's. To meet the demand for non-Atari printers, at least 25,000 copies of an add-on printer pack were sold through direct sales and the Atari Program Exchange. In 1986, Atari released the AtariWriter Plus, with new features along with a spell checker and mail merge available on floppy disk. AtariWriter 80, the final version of the software released in 1989, added support for the XEP80 80-column display. AtariWriter also spawned a port to the Atari ST with the ST Writer program, which was offered free on early models of the ST.

== History ==
=== Before AtariWriter ===
Atari's original marketing plan for the 8-bit family was to market the Atari 400 to the education and games sector, and the Atari 800 to small-office settings where CP/M and the Apple II were successful. Unfortunately, the lack of useful business software hindered any sales to the office market, and the machine quickly garnered a reputation as a glorified games box.

In 1980, Atari addressed this problem by introducing their own Atari Word Processor. It shipped on a copy protected floppy disk and required 48 kB of RAM. These requirements meant that the user had to have, at a minimum, a fully-expanded 800 and at least one Atari 810 disk drive. The machines lacked a parallel port and Atari did not sell printers with the SIO adaptor built-in, so printing required the Atari 850 interface and a parallel printer like the Atari 825 (a white labelled Centronics 737) or the widely recommended Epson MX-80.

While the software program was feature-packed, including support for things like two-column layout and super- and sub-scripting, reviewers pointed out that it was difficult to use. In addition to an extensive set of editing commands using control keys, including cursor commands that did not use the system's own cursor keys, more complex operations like loading documents or printing required trips through multi-level text menus. As these were essentially impossible to remember, a quick-reference sheet was included and the documentation was designed to stand up on a desk for continual use.

Word Processor was one of three major word processing software programs in the early days of the platform, with reviews from 1982 generally comparing it to Text Wizard from Datasoft and Letter Perfect from LKJ. These programs were much simpler than AtariWriter in terms of features, but they could run on any machine in the lineup and were far easier to use. For all of these reasons, they easily outsold Atari Word Processor. Text Wizard was often considered the best-buy, and Letter Perfect the best overall; Atari's was never recommended.

=== AtariWriter ===
Sometime in late 1981, Gary Furr left his job at GTE where he wrote application software specifications for government contractors. Moving to Atari, Furr and product manager Peggy Allen soon began planning to replace Word Processor. Instead of modifying the software, they decided to abandon it entirely. Furr used Word Processor to write the design specification for AtariWriter in March or April 1982.

A month or two later, they found that there were not enough programmers available in the company to write the program they specified. To bridge this gap, they hired 15-year-old William Robinson, the author of Text Wizard, to modify that program to run in a ROM cartridge. (Note: According to Furr, they contracted with Datasoft.) Robinson had previously written Text Wizard for the LA-based software company Datasoft, and it had garnered good reviews while running in very little RAM.

At the time, bank switching cartridges were uncommon, but Atari machines had always included the little-used ability to include up to 16 kB in a single cart. This would allow it to run on any machine in the lineup, even early-model 400's and the later 600XL which came with only 16 kB of RAM. It also meant there was no requirement for a floppy disk, and documents could be saved to the Atari 410 cassette drive. A huge advantage over Word Processor was that the program did not load into RAM and thus left much more memory free; on an 800, Word Processor had only about 10 kB free, enough for about one page of text, but AtariWriter had roughly 20 kB free even with DOS loaded, allowing small documents up to about six pages to be held entirely in memory.

Programming occurred during the summer of 1982, with internal testing in the fall of that same year, continuing into early 1983. Final testing and documentation was largely complete by the February–March time frame, when a status meeting of the Home Computer division was held. At the meeting, Furr described how they handled printers—the program would load a single printer driver at a time, with all four Atari printers supported and others available on disk. The manager refused to support non-Atari printers, and Furr had to call Robinson and tell him to remove the extra drivers. A short section was added to the manual stating additional drivers would be available from the Atari Program Exchange (APX).

AtariWriter 1.0 was released to production in the spring of 1983. The software is copyrighted 1982. Furr left Atari shortly thereafter and took a position with Datasoft. Three additional minor upgrades were released over the next year, culminating in Version C. It was also ported to several other languages, French, Spanish, German and Italian.

The program was an enormous success, becoming one of Atari's best-selling products of all time. Furr was later told that the original cartridge version had sold approximately 800,000 copies, not including any foreign language versions or the later versions like Plus and 80. Given that there were about 4 million machines sold in total, this represents a significant portion of the entire Atari fleet. For comparison, the most popular word processor on the IBM PC during this era, WordStar, had sold 650,000 copies across all platforms by the fall of 1983.

=== Printer drivers ===
The management decision to only support Atari printers was criticized by every product review as bad judgment on the part of Atari. Furr began writing drivers on his own at home, and a selection of 10 to 11 of these first appeared in the Fall 1983 APX catalog. When APX folded in 1984, Furr took over and began direct sales from his home. Furr found these were being purchased by users' groups who would distribute them to their members. He nevertheless sold 25,000 copies between 1983 and 1993 directly, not including the additional sales through APX. The last copy was sold in 1993. Several years later, Furr was contacted by a user group in Pennsylvania, leading to him shipping all the disks with source code to the group. Through this period the number of drivers expanded from the original 10 to as many as 159 by the time he delivered the code.

=== AtariWriter Plus ===
After the purchase of Atari by Jack Tramiel in 1984, the new Atari Corporation introduced cost-reduced versions of the 8-bit lineup known as the XE series. Among these was the 130XE model, which used bank switching to support 128 kB of RAM. For these machines, a new version of AtariWriter was introduced in November 1985, AtariWriter Plus. By this time, Robinson had left Datasoft and started his own company, Micro Fantasy. He continued to be the primary programmer on the core program, while Ron Rosen handled the mail merge, and R. Stanley Kistler the spell checker. Jeffrey Bass wrote the documentation.

AtariWriter Plus added a number of new features, giving it parity with the original Atari Word Processor in terms of power. Practically every part of the program changed in some way. Adding all of this functionality meant it no longer fit on a 16 kB cartridge, and it instead shipped on two floppy disks, one of them being a flippy with the "normal" version on one side and the 130XE version on the other. In contrast to the original, which booted in less than a second, loading the new version from disk took almost a minute.

The main difference compared to the original version was support for horizontal scrolling, which allowed direct editing of wider documents. This had been one of the notable features of the original Atari Word Processor, which used the platform's hardware assisted scrolling system to rapidly move the entire document horizontally to allow editing at up to 132 columns. The new version of AtariWriter worked in the same way, but expanded it even further to a maximum of 249 columns. Another notable change was that formatting options were set through a global menu, rather than on-screen within the document. A new save-as-plain-ASCII option allowed one to easily strip these codes out to send plain text to other users. Another major feature taken from Word Processor was the two-column layout. Dozens of other more minor changes were also included that made common operations much easier.

The new version also greatly expanded printer support. In addition to the original set of Atari printers and the ones added later like the XMM801 dot-matrix printer and XDM121 daisy wheel printer, selecting "other" showed drivers for the Epson FX-80, MicroPrism 480 and Juki 6100. This menu had another "other" selection which allowed you to load a driver from disk. The manual included an entire section on how to create your own printer driver, although the ones from the original APX disks continued to work.

Other new options were available as load-on-demand subprograms which were included on the program disk. Most notable was Atari Proofreader, a spell checker with 36,000 word library that took up both sides of the second disk. Selecting Verify Spelling from the main menu exited AtarWriter and ran Proofreader, which then loaded a selected document and continued. Another was the Mail Merge option, which worked in a similar fashion and could merge with up to 255 records of up to 15 fields stored in a second file. Because these were all disk based, they were quite slow; a 3,000 word document took about 15 minutes to spell check.

One downside to the new program was that it left only 12 kB free on an original 48 kB machine, only slightly more than the 10 kB of the original Word Processor. On the 130XE, running the custom version, 47,616 bytes were available. This was arranged as three banks of 15,872, but the program attempted to make this invisible by loading and saving all three from a single file. However, during editing one had to manually jump from bank to bank using a function key.

=== AtariWriter 80 ===
After years of complaints that the platform did not have any official 80-column support, Atari released the XEP80 in 1987, a plug-in display module that connects one of the Atari joystick ports to a composite monitor. Any program wishing to use this option had to be re-written to support the new mode, which was entirely unrelated to the built-in display hardware. Atari modified AtariWriter Plus to support the XEP80 and released it as AtariWriter 80, which was otherwise identical to Plus. The only major change was that the column display in the editor, formerly along the bottom of the screen, was now repositioned to the top. The XEP communicated in serial, so some delays are seen when the complete screen is redrawn, like when switching to the menu and back to the document, but the system is otherwise similar to Plus. The program was apparently completed in November 1987, but for unknown reasons was not released until well into the late summer of 1988.

=== ST Writer ===
After taking over Atari, the Tramiel family wanted to introduce an entirely new GUI-based computer, which emerged as the Atari ST in the summer of 1985. Concerned that the new system would lack useful software at its launch, which could lead to the same issues that caused people to dismiss the Atari 800, they decided to port AtariWriter to the ST. Programmer Dan Oliver ported the existing assembly language AtariWriter screen editor code to the ST while John Feagans converted the layout and formatting handlers to the C programming language. In two weeks, a version of AtariWriter Plus was up and running as ST Writer.

Running on the new machine gave the program many advantages. Memory was no longer limited, and the program was capable of handling very large documents. It also had a natural 80-column display, and was extremely fast. The program was so similar to the original it could exchange files with no edits.

As useful as the program was, it was not GUI-based, and was released for free while Atari began the search for a GUI program to replace it. By the end of 1985, several GUI word processors emerged, and ST Writer development at Atari came to an end. By this time it had garnered a major following of its own, and the replacements were seen as second rate in comparison. The company eventually allowed avid user Bruce Noonan to take over development. He continued releasing the product through a number of major versions, even adding a limited GUI for menu access, with the last releases in the 1990s.

== Reception ==
Reviews of AtariWriter were generally positive, with critics pointing out a lack of features like printer drivers, mail merge and spell checking.

ANALOG magazine's review describes how easy the program is to use, noting the review itself is being completed on the program only hours after it arrived. After noting that other printers, like the Epson in particular, were not supported, the article concludes "The AtariWriter has good documentation, is reasonably easy to learn and to use, doesn't seem to leave you hung up anywhere and has sufficient commands and flexibility to meet the needs of those who are most likely to use it... After a series of strikeouts, Atari has a hit on their hands."

Antic magazine lauded its speed, simplicity, and undo command, calling AtariWriter "fool proof". The only concerns were the lack of 3rd party printer support, overstrike mode, and mail merge. It concluded that "AtariWriter is the best non-game program Atari has released... Compared to the other word processors available, it is clearly superior on price and performance."

Creative Computing published a more extensive review, calling it "a candidate for Best Atari Product in a Long Time." The product is described as being easy to use and foolproof due to the many checks to prevent data loss. The lack of printer drivers is pointed out, but this is solved somewhat by allowing the user to embed printer control characters directly in the text. It concludes "My overall impression of AtariWriter is positive. It has good error trapping, is very easy to use and understand, and can be used with the cassette recorder. Powerful features like file merging and chain printing are supported... AtariWriter will be the best Atari word processor for the majority of Atari computer owners."

InfoWorld also reviewed it, giving it a less stellar rating of fair to good. It starts "Given the limitations of Atari hardware, AtariWriter is a good word processor. But if you write documents larger than your computer's memory, or if you need to display 80 columns of text on the screen, forget AtariWriter, stick to your typewriter or buy a more expensive computer." It later notes that documents can be strung together and printed as a single document using a code at the bottom of an individual document, avoiding the memory limitation. It goes on to point out a number of minor annoyances, including that there is no money-back guarantee.

The Addison-Wesley Book of Atari Software 1984 gave the software an overall A rating. The book stated that it "heralds a new era in word processing" for Atari 8-bit owners, and "a good reason in itself to purchase an Atari". It praised AtariWriter's ease of use and print preview, and concluded that the software was "a must for every serious writer and Atari owner."

Consumer Reports rated the combination of an Atari 800XL, AtariWriter and the Atari 1027 printer as the best word processing system for the price.

== Advertising ==
Shortly after AtariWriter was released, the last episode of M*A*S*H was aired in February 1983. Subsequently, Steve Ross hired M*A*S*H leading actor Alan Alda as a spokesperson for Atari in a five-year contract worth $10 million that would have produced television commercials for the company until 1988. Alda's relationship with Atari was announced at the Consumer Electronics Show in June 1983, with a successful series of commercials on television launched that same year. Atari explained their decision to use Alda as their spokesperson, noting that Alda had a high Q Score, making him the "best known, best liked television personality in America" at the time, and described their ambitious plan for advertising their hardware and software products across the print and television spectrum with a massive campaign.

Alda made at least two television advertisements about AtariWriter, (Note: Links provided below.) as well as written copy. In one print ad, the software was promoted with the headline "AtariWriter makes it easier to be a better writer", with an image of Alda sitting in front of the computer holding the software. Alda offered a celebrity testimonial for the product, telling readers, "You get to spend your energy on ideas rather than typing". AtariWriter was advertised for about US $99.95, which was considered half the cost of one of its competitors, LetterPerfect, which retailed for US $200. This "under $100" price point was marketed to consumers as a "family budget price", with one ad saying "You can't find a friendlier, more powerful word processor at twice the price".

== Description ==
The program has two main modes, the menu and the editor. The user can switch from the menu to the editor using the E command, and switch back by pressing Escape.

The main menu includes only eight options: Create File, which erases any text in memory and creates a new one; Delete File, to remove a file from disk; Edit File, Format Disk, Index of Disk Files (Directory), Load File, Print File and Save File. If a file is Created or Loaded, the user then selects Edit to enter the editor.

The editor displays the document text in the upper portion of the screen, and a four-line status area at the bottom. Prominently displayed in this status area is "PRESS ESC TO RETURN TO MENU". Above this is the indication of the current line and column, and a display of the tab stops rendered as up-arrows. At the very top of every document is a line of control characters that sets things like the tab spacing, margins and total document width. These are stored as text in the document, and are edited by cursoring over them and changing the values.

AtariWriter includes automatic word wrap, full-screen editing, dual-column printing, search and replace, undo, block editing and a print preview feature that allows users to view a printable page by scrolling across the screen. Printing attributes are set directly into the document using control characters. This allows direct changes to formatting such as margins, spacing, and justification.
