= ST Writer =

Word processor program for Atari ST computers

- Original authors: Dan Oliver, John Feagans, Bruce Noonan
- Developer: Atari Inc.
- Initial release: 1985; 41 years ago
- Final release: 4.8 / 1992; 34 years ago
- Written in: Assembly, C
- Operating system: Atari TOS
- Platform: Atari ST
- Type: Word processor
- License: Proprietary software

ST Writer is a word processor program for the Atari ST series of personal computers. It was introduced by Atari Corporation in 1985 along with the 520ST, the first machine in the ST family. Being a standard text file allowed it to share files across platforms unchanged. Running on the ST allowed it to display a full 80-column layout, create much larger files, and support additional features.

ST Writer did not use a graphical user interface (GUI). Atari said it was intended as a stop-gap until a GUI word processor was available. When this became available at the end of 1985 in the form of 1st Word, ST Writer stopped being distributed with new machines. By this point, it had garnered a faithful following and Atari released the source code to one of its more vocal advocates. It continued to be supported through multiple major updates until 1992, when it was known as ST Writer Elite.

== History ==
=== AtariWriter ===
When Atari began sales of the 8-bit series in late 1979, they released two models, the 400 and 800. The 800 was intended to be sold in professional settings, featuring a full mechanical keyboard and easily expandable memory. Sales of this model were initially slow due to a lack of suitable software and the company's reputation as a games developer. In 1981, Atari introduced Atari Word Processor. This required an 800 with 48 kB and a 810 disk drive, and left memory for about one page of text. The hardware demands and complexity led to reviewers always suggesting other products instead.

After a year on the market, Atari replaced Word Processor with the AtariWriter in 1982. This shipped on a ROM cartridge that allowed it to run on any machine in the Atari lineup. AtariWriter sold an estimated 800,000 copies of the US version, not including sales of the international versions or any of the later disk-based releases. (This means at least one in five of every 8-bit machine bought a copy of the program.) An updated version followed; AtariWriter Plus added 80-column typing using horizontal scrolling, a feature of the earlier Word Processor.

=== Release ===
In 1984, Atari was in serious financial trouble, losing about one million dollars a day. Its owners, Warner Communications, became desperate to sell the company. Jack Tramiel, recently forced out of Commodore, bought the company essentially for free, taking on its debt. Under new management, Atari sold existing stock of the 8-bit series cheaply while developing a new 16-bit machine, developing into the Atari ST series. The company wanted to release it with useful software to ensure the 520ST was not dismissed in the same fashion as the 800.

ST Writer was created by Dan Oliver after reading a review of the ST criticizing the lack of applications, not even having a word processor. He then created most of ST Writer that weekend. The next week it was tweaked into a ready to be used form. Shown to his manager John Feagans who joined in and wrote printer interface code. After only two weeks the program was ready. Dan Oliver left Atari soon after and joined Apple to work on the Apple IIGS.

As the ST supported an 80-column layout, the main change was to turn off the default scrolling from Plus and display the normal 80-column layout at startup. The resulting program was so similar to the original AtariWriter that it could share files unchanged. It also included a command to download files from 8-bit machines equipped with the Atari 850 RS-232 system, reading them in on the ST's built-in serial port. The memory of the ST was much larger than the 8-bits, allowing long documents to be edited and saved on the larger-capacity 3.5-inch floppies.

=== Bug fixes ===
The program was released with a number of bugs. One user, Bruce Noonan, noted that two-column layouts did not work when double-spaced printing was turned on and the document was wider than 80 columns. In September 1985, only a month after the machines became available, Noonan met Leonard Tramiel and Sig Hartmann at a user group meeting and raised the issue. They told him that bugs in the program would not be fixed, as it was "complete", and that he should not expect much as it was free. Noonan called Atari and talked to Feagans, who told him to contact Atari-related journals. They were quick to point out other bugs in the program. Noonan called Feagans back and asked if he might be able to gain access to the source code, a request that eventually worked its way to Hartmann who approved the release. Noonan released four bug-fix versions over the next year, 1.04 through 1.07.

=== ST Writer Elite ===
Atari had always said that ST Writer was being released as a stop-gap while true GUI word processors emerged. This occurred not long after the 520ST was released. Atari purchased the rights to 1st Word and distributed it. Many users preferred ST Writer over 1st Word due to its speed and powerful features. The speed was a side-effect of the program using a special text console mode that was intended for rapid output, but it lacked the ability to work with the mouse and other event-driven parts of the GUI. (Note: The missing feature was the event_multi call that took time to process. The console mode did not call this routine and this was why it was faster.) For this reason, the program lacked any mouse control, and everything was keyboard driven.

This changed with the introduction of 2.0 in the fall of 1987. This broke the program into two, the original editor using the same text mode, and a second GUI-based program that allowed some GUI-based control. Pressing Escape in the editor switched to the original text-based menu screen, while clicking the right-hand mouse button switched to the new GUI-based version. This consisted of a single empty screen filling window with a conventional menu bar at the top. This allowed you to select files using the ST's built-in file dialogs, control various settings, and view help text in dialog boxes. The other feature of the GUI was the ability to left-click in the editor to send the string of cursor key commands that moved the cursor to the clicked location. Some of these features were added by the original author, Feagans.

Noonan continued improving the new version, and starting with 2.3 renamed it ST Writer Elite to distinguish it from the original. Noonan continued adding bug fixes and new features for years. In March 1989 he noted that 3.0 might be the last to be released, but the last known version is 4.8 from 1992.

== Description ==
ST Writer was very similar to AtariWriter, the main difference being the always-on 80-column support. The program had two modes, menu mode and editor mode. In menu mode, the user can perform various high-level functions like loading, saving and printing files. To switch to edit mode, the Edit command was selected. When in the editor mode, pressing Escape returned to the menus.

The editor used extended ASCII characters as codes for various settings like margins and line width. These appeared in inverse video in the document. Most documents had a row of these across the first line of the file, controlling document-wide settings. Similar codes could be inserted in the document to change the layout, and other codes could be used to change the text style and insert direct printer commands.

The menu mode offered commands to list the files on the currently inserted floppy disk, create, delete, load and save files, format the disk, and print. It also included the ability to receive a file from the 850 on an 8-bit machine, the "hirez" toggle that toggled the vertical layout between 22 and 37 lines of text, toggle the colors between black-on-white to white-on-black, quit the program, and to switch to the editor screen.

After loading TOS and ST Writer, a 520ST had about 180 kB free, enough for well over 100 typical pages of text, about 1500 bytes each. A display in the editor showed the remaining amount of free memory as you typed.

== Reception ==
ST Writer was well received by its users and reviewers, both for its features and, in particular, its speed.

In a comparison review of seven word processors for the ST in STart magazine, Ian Chadwick called ST Writer "a capable and mature outgrowth of the successful AtariWriter for 8-bit Atari's. It is good enough for moderately demanding work, but lacks the document-oriented features necessary for technical writing and other major undertakings such as scripts and books." He notes that it is free, and points users to the Atari special interest group on CompuServe or Atari's own bulletin board system to download it.

Writing in ST-Log magazine, David Plotkin says "I suspect ST Writer's popularity surprised Atari" due to its lack of a GUI and its use of "variety of arcane codes in your document" and other annoying features like only opening a single document at a time and the need to run a separate program to change printers. He notes "The trade-off for these shortcomings is speed, and many people swear by ST Writer because it is so fast." and that it includes numerous features not seen in most word processors, like "double column printing, headers and footers".

While reviewing a three-in-one product that contained a word processor, Matt Loveless noted that "I use ST Writer for long documents that don't require sophisticated formatting; it's fast and makes major editing a simple job."
