= Atari Word Processor =

1981 8-bit word processor program

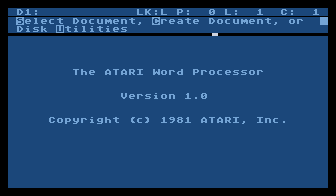
- Developer: Atari, Inc.
- Release: 1981; 45 years ago
- Stable release: 1.0
- Written in: Assembly
- Platform: Atari 8-bit computers
- Size: 48 kB
- Type: Word processor
- License: Proprietary software

Atari Word Processor is a word processor program for the Atari 8-bit computers, announced by Atari, Inc. in January 1981 and shipped that summer. The program was powerful for its era, including numerous features like superscripts and two-column layouts. It was also quite complex, with a long list of control keys for basic operations and text-based menus for more complex ones. It left little memory free after loading, so longer documents had to be stored as separate files of about a page each and printing demanded a long re-formatting process as they were stitched together.

Technical requirements were demanding; it required 48 kB of RAM, required at least one floppy disk drive, and required an external parallel port adaptor to connect to a dot-matrix printer. The limited machine support and demanding requirements led Atari to release AtariWriter the next year with the launch of the XL series machines. AtariWriter offered most of the features of Word Processor but was much easier to use and shipped on a single 16 kB ROM cartridge that ran across the entire lineup.

== History ==
The first Atari 8-bit computers, the 400 and 800, began shipping in November 1979. The original idea for having two members of the family was to sell the 800 into the professional market, then dominated by CP/M machines and the Apple II, while the 400 was aimed at children, education and gaming. Very little business software was available at launch, and the machines garnered a reputation, in keeping with Atari's history, as glorified games consoles.

After a year, the company decided that professional software was going to be required if they hoped to sell the 800 into the business market. Among the many programs being used on CP/M, word processing had emerged as a significant force and WordStar had become a major market unto itself. With no comparable system available on their platform, at the Winter CES on 8 January 1981, Atari announced they would be releasing their own. It was first mentioned in print in the March/April 1981 edition of ANALOG Computing. The program shipped that summer. Normally $149, between September 1 and October 31 it was offered free to anyone that purchased an 800 and 810 disk drive.

The program ran only on the Atari 800 with 48 kB of RAM and operating system "B" ROMs, which was the vast majority of 800 production. It would run on a 400 if expanded to 48 kB, but this was not officially supported and voided the computer's warranty. It also needed at least one disk drive, and to print, the 850 Interface Module along with a suitable Centronics-port based printer like the Atari 825.

With the introduction of the 1200XL in 1983, Atari needed a new word processor that ran in the expanded operating system and memory. Instead of upgrading Atari Word Processor, they hired the author of a well-received 3rd party product and introduced the entirely new AtariWriter. This was in the form of a 16 kB ROM cartridge that ran on all of the Atari lineup even with as little as 16 kB RAM.

== Description ==
The program shipped on two floppy disks, a copy protected one containing the program itself, and another unprotected disk with various document examples for training. It also included a cassette tape that included a lengthy audio recording used as training aid. The manual set was in three parts, an alphabetical reference, a training guide, and a one-sheet quick reference. The resulting set was packaged in a three-ring binder designed to stand up on a desk for easy reference. If the original program disk stopped working, there was no recourse, as Atari did not offer low-cost replacements.

Movement and basic editing were handled using an extensive list of control keys. Basic cursor movement did not use the cursor keys, nor did they follow the WordStar pattern in spite of those being the de facto standard of the era. More complex editing and other commands were accessed through multi-level menus, entered by pressing Escape and returning to the editor with the Edit command.

The Atari machines were limited to a 40-column display, which made editing practical documents difficult. The solution in this case used the system's hardware-assisted horizontal scrolling system to move the text as the cursor moved across an 80- or 132-column layout. A second system to aid with formatting was a print preview mode which displayed a full-page view in a compressed format using the Atari's high-resolution graphics mode to give an indication of the overall layout. This was triggered by pressing the SELECT function key.

The 48 kB RAM of the machines, combined with the large size of the program and the need to load DOS, left only about 10 kB of free memory. This limited the length of the documents that could be worked on to about 100 lines, (Note: InfoWorld's review says "up to 200 lines!".) or roughly about one page. The amount of free memory was indicated by a bar that moved left as more text was added, with the suggestion that a new document be started once the line reached the left half of the screen. This meant longer documents had to be split into parts of a page each and the system included functionality that combined the multiple files back together for printing. The single-density, single-sided format used by the disks allowed them to hold about 60 pages.

Word Processor supported dot matrix printers like Atari's 825 (a relabeled Centronics 737) and the widely recommended Epson MX-80. It also supported the Smith Corona TP-1 daisy wheel printer.

== Reception ==
One of the largest reviews of the product appeared in the May 1982 issue of the major magazine InfoWorld. The reviewer, Robert DeWitt, would become better known as an editor of Antic magazine. DeWitt was especially impressed by the preview display that "accurately shows the layout of the actual text. It also shows the margin positions, the present location of the window and the cursor, and certain formatting information." He also praised several less common features, like super and subscript support, double-column layout and compressed and expanded text. He was not impressed by the scrolling and found it easier to set the margins at position 38 and then reset it to 80 immediately before printing. This was quite slow; the sample file he created was 10 pages long and required 15 minutes to reformat and print. The review ultimately rated each review category as "good" or "excellent", but concluded "this is not really a business or production system."

Jon Loveless, writing in the charter issue of Antic, began his comparison review by calling Atari Word Processor "the most sophisticated and powerful of the three programs being compared". (Note: The other two were Text Wizard and Letter Perfect. The author of Text Wizard later wrote AtariWriter.) He noted that it does "an excellent job of compensating for the 40 column screen", and praised its use of the scrolling display and preview mode. However, he also wrote that the program "seems very complicated" and that simple operations like printing the document took four levels of menu traversal, while reformatting and paginating took five.

Another comparison review in Creative Computing came to much the same conclusion. Philip Good introduced: "The Atari Word Processor has the best text-editor of the three full-screen word processors, if you can figure out how to use it." This was made difficult by the documentation, which was extensive but "completely incomprehensible. The combined manuals are more cumbersome (and bulky) than any of the more than sixty manuals I recently reviewed." To illustrate the complexity, he lists the instructions needed to delete a block of text, saying "See, it's as easy as a,b,c,d,e,f,g,h,i,j,k,l", and going on to note that moving a block of text required 28 steps.

A later review of its replacement, AtariWriter, started by summing up Word Processor by stating "It was a fairly expensive word processor that had an enormous number of functions and features" but while it "was very versatile, [it] was also rather cumbersome."
