= Psychological pricing =

Behavioral economics theory that certain prices have a psychological impact

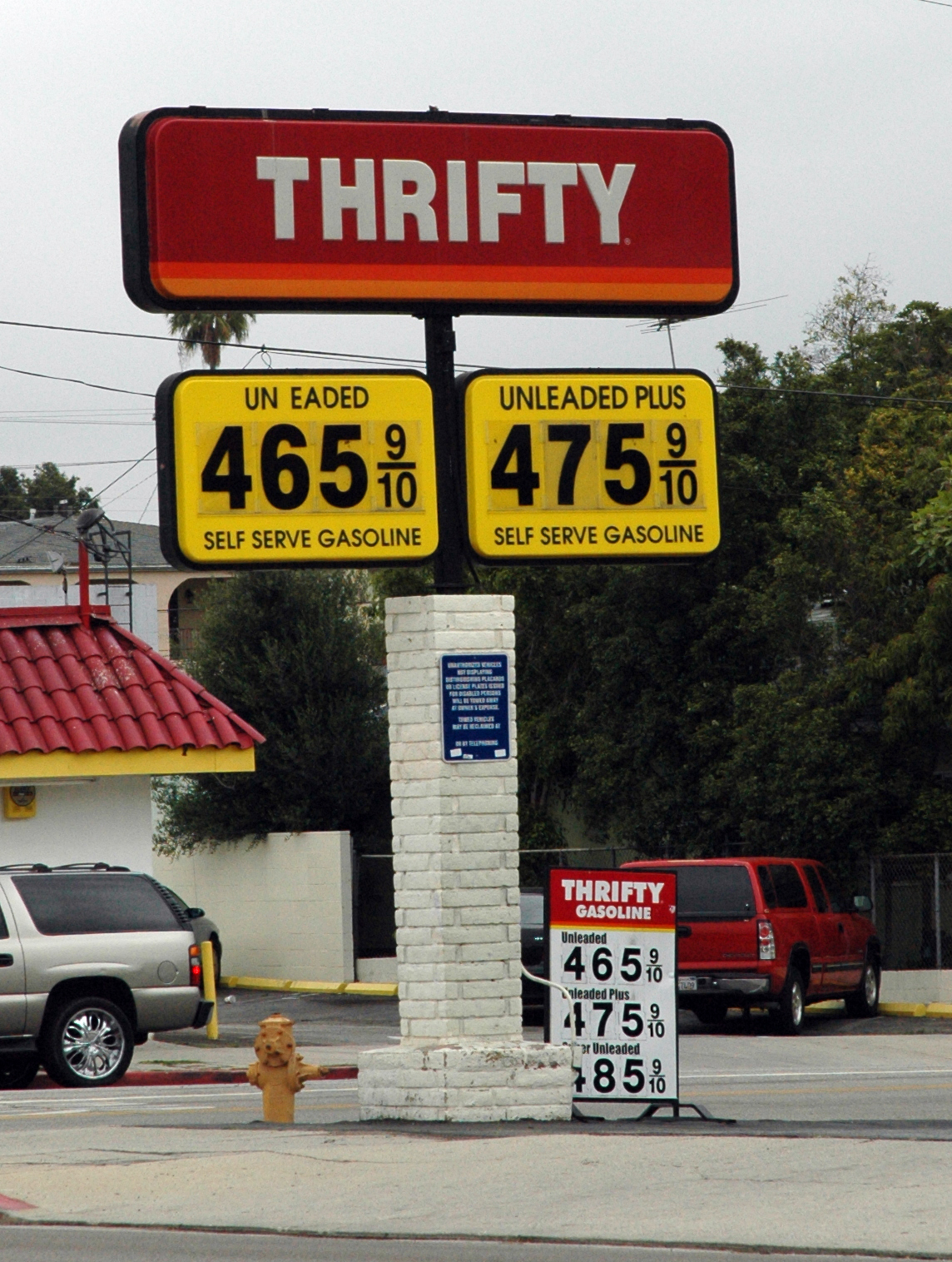
Example of psychological pricing at a gas station

Psychological pricing (also price ending or charm pricing) is a pricing and marketing strategy based on the theory that certain prices have a psychological impact. In this pricing method, retail prices are often expressed as just-below numbers: numbers that are just a little less than a round number, e.g. $19.99 or £2.98. There is evidence that consumers tend to perceive just-below prices (also referred to as "odd prices") as being lower than they are, tending to round to the next lowest monetary unit. Thus, prices such as $1.99 may to some degree be associated with spending $1 rather than $2. The theory that drives this is that pricing practices such as this cause greater demand than if consumers were perfectly rational. Psychological pricing is one cause of price points.

== Overview ==
According to a 1997 study published in the Marketing Bulletin, approximately 60% of prices in advertising material ended in the digit 9, 30% ended in the digit 5, 7% ended in the digit 0 and the remaining seven digits combined accounted for only slightly over 3% of prices evaluated. In the UK, before the withdrawal of the halfpenny coin in 1969, prices often ended in 11 1/2d (elevenpence halfpenny: just under a shilling, which was 12d); another example (before 1961) was £1/19/11 3/4d. (one pound, nineteen shillings, and elevenpence three farthings) which is one farthing under £2. This is still seen today in gasoline (petrol) pricing ending in 9/10 of the local currency's smallest denomination; for example, in the US the price of a gallon of gasoline almost always ends at US$0.009 (e.g. US$3.599).

Digit ending	Proportion in the 1997 Marketing Bulletin study
0	7.5%
1	0.3%
2	0.3%
3	0.8%
4	0.3%
5	28.6%
6	0.3%
7	0.4%
8	1.0%
9	60.7%

In a traditional cash transaction, fractional pricing imposes tangible costs on the vendor (printing fractional prices), the cashier (producing awkward change) and the customer (stowing the change). These factors have become less relevant with the increased use of checks, credit and debit cards, and other forms of currency-free exchange; also, in some jurisdictions the addition of sales tax makes the advertised price irrelevant and the final digit of the real transaction price effectively random.

The psychological pricing theory is based on one or more of the following hypotheses:

- Thomas and Morwitz (2005) coined the term left-digit effect and suggested that this bias is caused by the use of an anchoring heuristic in multi-digit comparisons.
- Another rationale for just-below pricing is prospect theory. This theory holds that consumers facing uncertainty in decision making base the value of an alternative on gains or losses offered by the alternative relative to some reference point, rather than on final absolute states of wealth or welfare. The theory also incorporates evidence that small deviations from a reference point tend to be over-valued. So, based on prospect theory, pricing something only a few cents under a whole dollar could be beneficial to the seller. This theory works well because of how the reference point is established by the consumer. The reference point for something that is $19.98 would be $20. This leads the just-below price to be seen as involving a gain, thus making it feel like a better deal.
- Consumers ignore the least significant digits rather than do the proper rounding. Even though the cents are seen and not totally ignored, they may subconsciously be partially ignored. Keith Coulter, Associate Professor of Marketing at the Graduate School of Management, Clark University, suggests that this effect may be enhanced when the cents are printed smaller (for example, $19^{99}).
- Fractional prices suggest to consumers that goods are marked at the lowest possible price.
- When items are listed in a way that is segregated into price bands (such as an online real estate search), price ending is used to keep an item in a lower band, to be seen by more potential purchasers.

The theory of psychological pricing is controversial. Some studies show that buyers, even young children, have a very sophisticated understanding of true cost and relative value and that, to the limits of the accuracy of the test, they behave rationally. Other researchers claim that this ignores the non-rational nature of the phenomenon and that acceptance of the theory requires belief in a subconscious level of thought processes, a belief that economic models tend to deny or ignore. Results from research using modern scanner data are mixed.

Restaurants and high-end retailers often price in even numbers to increase their brand image.

== Theories ==
Kaushik Basu used game theory in 1997 to argue that rational consumers value their own time and effort in calculation. Such consumers process the price from left to right and tend to mentally replace the last two digits of the price with an estimate of the mean "cent component" of all goods in the marketplace. In a sufficiently large marketplace, this implies that any individual seller can charge the largest possible "cent component" (99¢) without significantly affecting the average of cent components and without changing customer behavior. Ruffle and Shtudiner's (2006) laboratory test shows considerable support for Basu's 99-cent pricing equilibrium, particularly when other sellers' prices are observable.

The introduction of the euro in 2002, with its various exchange rates, distorted existing nominal price patterns while at the same time retaining real prices. A European wide study (el Sehity, Hoelzl and Kirchler, 2005) investigated consumer price digits before and after the euro introduction for price adjustments. The research showed a clear trend towards psychological pricing after the transition. Further, Benford's law as a benchmark for the investigation of price digits was successfully introduced into the context of pricing. The importance of this benchmark for detecting irregularities in prices was demonstrated and with it a clear trend towards psychological pricing after the nominal shock of the euro introduction.

Another phenomenon noted by economists is that a price point for a product (such as $4.99) remains stable for a long period of time, with companies slowly reducing the quantity of product in the package until consumers begin to notice. At this time, the price will increase marginally (to $5.05) and then within an exceptionally short time will increase to the next price point ($5.99, for example).

Several studies have shown that when prices are presented to a prospect in descending order (versus ascending order), positive effects for the seller result, mainly a willingness to pay higher price, higher perceptions of value, and higher probability of purchase. The reason for this is that when presented in the former, the higher price serves as a reference point, and the lower prices are perceived favorably as a result.

=== In consumer behavior ===
Thomas and Morwitz (2005) suggested that this bias is a manifestation of the pervasive anchoring heuristic in multi-digit comparisons. (The anchoring heuristic is one of the heuristics identified by Nobel laureate Kahneman and his co-author Tversky.) Judgments of numerical differences are anchored on leftmost digits, causing a bias in relative magnitude judgments. This hypothesis suggests that people perceive the difference between 1.99 and 3.00 to be closer to 2 than to 1 because their judgments are anchored on the leftmost digit.

Stiving and Winer (1997) examined the left-digit effect using scanner panel models. They proposed that 9-ending prices can influence consumer behavior through two distinct processes: image effects and level effects. Image effect suggests that 99-ending prices are associated with images of sales promotions. Level effect captures the magnitude underestimation caused by anchoring on the leftmost digits of prices. Their results suggest that both of these effects account for the influence of 9-ending prices in grocery stores. Manning and Sprott (2009) demonstrated that left-digit anchoring can influence consumer choices using experimental studies.

Choi, Lee, and Ji (2012) examined the interactive effects of 9-ending prices and message framing in advertisements. The researchers found that when pairing nine-ending prices with positive messages, advertisements were much more positively received by consumers. This in turn increased their likelihood of making a purchase decision.

=== In consumer finance ===
Psychological pricing has also been observed in consumer finance, particularly in the presentation of interest rates. Patrick M. Brenner of the Southwest Public Policy Institute has argued that the annual percentage rate (APR), introduced under the Truth in Lending Act, can function similarly to charm pricing by shaping borrower perception of cost. While APR was designed to standardize and simplify loan comparisons, Brenner contends that it may compress complex, long-term borrowing costs into a single figure that obscures total repayment.

In this interpretation, small changes in the leftmost digit, such as mortgage rates falling from 6.00 percent to 5.98 percent, can influence consumer sentiment despite minimal underlying differences, reflecting the same left-digit bias observed in retail pricing. This framing encourages borrowers to focus on nominal rates or monthly payments rather than lifetime cost.

=== In financial markets ===
Left-digit effect has also been shown to influence stock-market transactions. Bhattacharya, Holden, and Jacobsen (2011) examined the left-digit effect in stock market transactions. They found that there was excess buying at just-below prices ($1.99) versus round numbers ($2.00) right above them. This discrepancy in buy-sell can lead to significant changes in 24-hour returns that can meaningfully impact markets.

=== In public policy ===
Research has also found psychological pricing relevant to the study of politics and public policy. For instance, a study of Danish municipal income taxes found evidence of "odd taxation" as tax rates with a nine-ending were found to be over-represented compared to other ending digits. Further, it was found that citizens' evaluations of public-school districts in a Danish population changed noticeably based on the leftmost digit. In particular, the researchers looked at minuscule changes in average grades that shifted the leftmost digit. Once this value changed, citizens responded more drastically and as such their stance in terms of public policy on the issue changed.

MacKillop et al. (2014) looked at how the left-digit effect affects the relationship between price hikes and smoking cessation. There was a very clearly demonstrated inverse relationship between the price of cigarettes and individual's motivation to smoke. Researchers found that price hikes that impacted the leftmost digit in the price (i.e. $4.99 vs. $5.00) were particularly effective in causing change among adult smokers. These findings can be utilized by public policy researchers and legislators to implement more effective cigarette tax policies.

== Regulation ==
According to Davidovich-Weisberg (2013), in Israel several high-profile regulatory commissions have joined to ban retailers from charging prices ending in 99. These regulatory bodies have claimed that this was an attempt to make prices look less expensive to customers. In addition, due to the phasing out of certain denominations of coins in Israel, these quirky prices also made little practical sense in terms of everyday shopping.

== Historical comments ==
Exactly how psychological pricing came into common use is not clear, though it is known the practice arose during the late 19th century. Scot Morris' 1979 Book of Strange Facts & Useless Information speculated that it originated when Melville E. Stone founded the Chicago Daily News in 1875 and priced it at one cent to compete with the nickel papers of the day; however, Cecil Adams has directly addressed Morris' claims, noting that Stone sold the News in 1876, and also that the News archives indicate that "prices ending in 9 (39 cents, 69 cents, etc.) were rare until well into the 1880s and weren't all that common then. The practice didn't really become widespread until the 1920s, and even then prices as often as not ended in .95, not .99."

Others have suggested that fractional pricing was first adopted as a control on employee theft. For cash transactions with a round price, there is a chance that a dishonest cashier will pocket the bill rather than record the sale. For cash transactions with a just-below price, the cashier must nearly always make change for the customer. This generally means opening the cash register which creates a record of the sale in the register and reduces the risk of the cashier stealing from the store owner.

Since the registration is done with the process of returning change, according to Bill Bryson odd pricing came about because by charging odd amounts like 49 and 99 cents (or 45 and 95 cents when nickels are more used than pennies), the cashier very probably had to open the till for the penny change and thus announce the sale.

In the former Czechoslovakia, people called this pricing "baťovská cena" ("Baťa's price"), referring to Tomáš Baťa, a Czech manufacturer of footwear. He began to widely use this practice in 1920.

Price ending has also been used by retailers to highlight sale or clearance items for administrative purposes. A retailer might end all regular prices in 95 and all sale prices in 50. This makes it easy for a buyer to identify which items are discounted when looking at a report.

In its 2005 United Kingdom general election manifesto, the Official Monster Raving Loony Party proposed the introduction of a 99-pence coin to "save on change".

A recent trend in some monetary systems as inflation gradually reduces the value of money is to eliminate the smallest denomination coin (typically 0.01 of the local currency). The total cost of purchased items is then rounded up or down to, for example, the nearest 0.05. This may have an effect on future just-below pricing, especially at small retail outlets where single-item purchases are more common, encouraging vendors to price with .98 and .99 endings, which are rounded up when .05 is the smallest denomination, while .96 and .97 are rounded down. An example of this practice is in Australia, where 5 cents has been the smallest denomination coin since 1992, but pricing at .98 or .99 on items under several hundred dollars is still almost universally applied (e.g.: $1.99–299.99), while goods on sale often price at .94 and its variations. Finland and the Netherlands were the first two countries using the euro currency to eliminate the 1-cent and 2-cent coins.

== See also ==
- Pricing
- Price point
- Marketing mix
- Mental accounting
- Microeconomics
- Numerical cognition
