= Price point =

Economics term

Price points A, B, and C, along a demand curve (where P is price and Q represents demand)

In economics, a price point is a point along the demand curve at which demand for a given product is supposed to stay relatively high.

== Characteristics ==
Introductory microeconomics depicts a demand curve as downward-sloping to the right and either linear or gently convex to the origin. The downward slope generally holds, but the model of the curve is only piecewise true, as price surveys indicate that demand for a product is not a linear function of its price and not even a smooth function. Demand curves resemble a series of waves rather than a straight line.

The diagram shows price points at the points labeled A, B, and C. When a vendor increases a price beyond a price point (say to a price slightly above price point B), sales volume decreases by an amount more than proportional to the price increase. This decrease in quantity demanded more than offsets the additional revenue from the increased unit price. As a result, total revenue (price multiplied by quantity demanded) decreases when a firm raises its price beyond a price point. Technically, the price elasticity of demand is low (inelastic) at a price lower than the price point (steep section of the demand curve), and high (elastic) at a price higher than a price point (gently sloping part of the demand curve). Firms commonly set prices at existing price-points as a marketing strategy.

== Causes ==
There are three main reasons for price points to appear:

1. Substitution price points
  - price points occur at the price of a close substitute
  - when an item's price rises above the cost of a close substitute, the quantity demanded drops sharply
2. Customary price points
  - the market grows accustomed to paying a certain amount for a type of product
  - increasing the price beyond this amount will cause sales to drop dramatically
3. Perceptual price points (also referred to as "psychological pricing" or as "odd-number pricing")
  - raising a price above 99 cents will cause demand to fall disproportionately because people perceive $1.00 as a significantly higher price

== Oligopoly pricing ==
In relation to customary price points, oligopolies can also generate price points. Such price points do not necessarily result from collusion, but as an emergent property of oligopolies: when all firms sell at the same price, any firm which attempts to raise its selling price will experience a decrease in sales and revenues (preventing firms from raising prices unilaterally); on the other hand, any firm in an oligopoly which lowers its prices will most likely be matched by competitors, resulting in small increases in sales but decreases in revenues (for all the firms in that market). This effect can potentially produce a kinked demand-curve where the kink lies at the point of the current price-level in the market. These results depend on the elasticity of the demand curve and on the properties of each market.

== See also ==
- Convex preferences
- Cost the limit of price
- List of topics in industrial organization
- Pricing
