= Talkin' Out the Side of Your Neck =

1984 single by Cameo

Single by Cameo

from the album She's Strange
- B-side: "Léve Toi!"
- Released: 1984
- Studio: Unique (New York City)
- Genre: R&B; funk; hip hop
- Length: 4:04
- Label: Atlanta Artists
- Songwriters: Larry Blackmon; Charles Singleton; Nathan David Leftenant; Thomas Michael Jenkins
- Producer: Larry Blackmon

Cameo singles chronology
"She's Strange" (1984)	"Talkin' Out the Side of Your Neck" (1984)	"Hangin' Downtown" (1984)

Music video
- "Talkin' Out the Side of Your Neck" on YouTube

"Talkin' Out the Side of Your Neck" (often simply called "Neck") is a song by American funk band Cameo and the third track on their 1984 album, She's Strange. The song was released as a single with "Léve Toi!" in 1984. Since its release, it has become associated with HBCU bands.

== Composition ==
"Talkin' Out the Side of Your Neck" features elements of hip hop and funk music. Daryl Easlea, writing for BBC Music, described the song as "an attack on the Reagan government [...] rocking a metal groove, full of sassy uptown horns with Talking Heads-style keyboard washes". The song's lyrics mention presidents Richard Nixon, Gerald Ford, Jimmy Carter, and Ronald Reagan, with the chorus repeating "You're gonna get what's comin' to you yet".

== Legacy ==
"Talkin' Out the Side of Your Neck" has become a commonly played arrangement for many marching bands, particularly HBCU bands. The tradition's origins started with Norfolk State University marching band, who’s said to have first played it in the 1984 edition of the Battle of the Bay, NSU's football rivalry with Hampton University.

The song has also become associated with the LSU Tiger Marching Band and LSU Tigers football. Performances of "Neck" have become controversial due to a vulgar crowd cheer ("Suck that Tiger dick, bitch"), based on the song's chorus, that resulted in the arrangement being officially discontinued in 2010. After being brought back in 2013, it has reportedly been used sparingly. During a 2017 home game against Texas A&M, NFL wide receiver and former Tiger Odell Beckham Jr. approached the band director and convinced them to play the song, reportedly offering to cover any fine the performance would incur. During a 2018 game against Georgia, the crowd broke into the chant several times despite the tune never being played. The night before the 2020 CFP National Championship between LSU and Clemson, a performance of "Neck" on Bourbon Street drew large crowds. An instrumental of the song was included in the video game EA Sports College Football 25 as recorded by the EA Sports College Football Marching Band.

This song's association with marching bands inspired the similarly named "Talkin' Out da Side of Ya Neck!", a 2008 single by Dem Franchize Boyz.

== Charts ==
Chart (1984)	Peak position
US Hot R&B/Hip-Hop Songs (Billboard)	21
