= Jim Nantz =

American sportscaster (born 1959)

- Nantz in 2026
- Born: James William Nantz III; May 17, 1959 (age 67); Charlotte, North Carolina, U.S.
- Education: University of Houston
- Occupation: Sports commentator
- Years active: 1980–present
- Spouses: Ann-Lorraine Carlsen (m. 1983; div. 2009); Courtney Richards (m. 2012)
- Children: 3
- Sports commentary career
- Genre: Play-by-play
- Sports: National Football League; NCAA March Madness; PGA Tour
- Employer: CBS Sports (1985–present)

James William Nantz III (born May 17, 1959) is an American sportscaster who has worked on telecasts of the National Football League (NFL), NCAA Division I men's basketball, the NBA, and the PGA Tour for CBS Sports since 1985. He has anchored CBS's coverage of the Masters Tournament since 1989 and been the lead play-by-play announcer on CBS's NFL coverage since 2004. He was also the lead broadcaster for the NCAA men's basketball tournament from 1990 to 2023.

== Early life and education ==
Born in Charlotte, North Carolina, Nantz grew up in New Orleans, Louisiana, Colts Neck Township, New Jersey, and Marlboro Township, New Jersey, where he attended Marlboro High School. In high school, he was co-captain of the basketball team and co-captain and number one player on the golf team. He was a member of Bamm Hollow Country Club.

Nantz then matriculated at the University of Houston where he played on the Cougars men's golf team, rooming with future professional golfers Fred Couples and Blaine McCallister. He graduated with a Bachelor of Arts in Radio and Television Broadcasting in 1981. It was during this time that Nantz got his first experience in sports broadcasting with the CBS Radio Network, transmitting taped interviews to Win Elliot for the latter's Sports Central USA weekend reports.

== Broadcasting career ==
=== Before CBS Sports ===
Nantz started as an anchor and sportscaster for KHOU in Houston, Texas, in the early 1980s and then became a weekend sports anchor on KSL-TV in Salt Lake City (1982–1985) where he called BYU football games and Utah Jazz games along with Hot Rod Hundley.

=== At CBS Sports ===
Nantz joined CBS Sports in 1985, initially working as a studio host for CBS's college football and basketball coverage, and as an on-course reporter for PGA Tour golf, as well as calling NFL games on Westwood One (from 1988 to 1990, when he was moved to television, Nantz called Sunday Night Football games for what was then called CBS Radio Sports). In 1989, he moved from the college football studio show to play-by-play for two seasons, calling a full season of games including the Army-Navy game and the Cotton Bowl, with analysts Pat Haden (in 1989) and Tim Brant (in 1990).

Nantz has anchored CBS' coverage of the Masters Tournament since 1989. Following Brent Musburger's ouster from CBS in 1990, Nantz moved into the lead play-by-play role on the NCAA Final Four men's basketball finals, working with Billy Packer (1991–2008), Clark Kellogg (2009–2013), Steve Kerr (2011–2014), and Greg Anthony (2013–2014). Nantz's most recent partners on March Madness coverage were Bill Raftery and Grant Hill. In October 2022, Nantz announced his intention to step away from basketball coverage to spend time with family and will be replaced by Ian Eagle.

Nantz opens each of his broadcasts by saying, "Hello, friends". The greeting came about as a way for Nantz to identify himself to his father, who had been suffering from Alzheimer's disease.

Nantz's broadcast style includes a penchant for informing listeners of historical facts or statistics regarding athletes or situations as a competition progresses.

==== The NFL on CBS (1987–1992) ====
On October 4, 1987, Nantz made his first on-air appearance during an NFL game when he served as a reporter during the Dallas Cowboys at New York Jets game during the NFL strike in a game which featured replacement players, he appeared outside the stadium and in the crowd interviewing fans, in a time before sideline reporters were commonplace at regular season games. It would be his only appearance on CBS's NFL coverage during the 1987 season. In 1988, Nantz would work his first NFL play-by-play assignments, covering the October 16 Tampa Bay Buccaneers at Indianapolis Colts game (with his college football partner Haden) and the December 4 Dallas Cowboys at Cleveland Browns game (with analyst Ken Stabler). In 1989, Nantz would call three more NFL games (with Haden), and in 1990 he would call two games with analyst Tim Brant. Nantz would work a full schedule of NFL games on play-by-play for the first time in 1991, calling games with analyst Hank Stram and would then work again with Stram during the 1992 season, also paring with Dan Fouts for two games in September 1992 (when Pat Summerall was calling US Open tennis).

On October 4, 1992, he paired with analyst Randy Cross when Cross' regular broadcast partner, Dick Stockton, was covering MLB baseball. For the 1993 season, Nantz would join Cross full-time, and they would be assigned to the January 16, 1994 NFC Divisional Playoff game between the Green Bay Packers and the Dallas Cowboys.

==== College Football (1994–1997) ====
CBS would lose the NFL contract after the 1993 season, and Nantz would return to college football and call three games during the next two seasons, the 1994 Sun Bowl (with analyst Doug Flutie), and during the 1995 season, both the Sun Bowl and the Fiesta Bowl, with analyst Terry Donahue. He would work with Donahue again for a full season of play-by-play in 1996, while in 1997 he would return to hosting the College Football studio show.

==== The NFL returns to CBS (1998–present) ====
After hosting CBS's pre-game program The NFL Today from 1998 to 2003, he became The NFL on CBS' top play-by-play announcer in 2004. That move sent Greg Gumbel to the studio, and Nantz to the stadium booth with Phil Simms.

On February 4, 2007, Nantz called the play-by-play of Super Bowl XLI. He joins Curt Gowdy, Kevin Harlan, and Dick Enberg as the only play-by-play announcers to ever call both a Super Bowl and an NCAA Men's Basketball Championship Game. (Greg Gumbel called CBS's previous Super Bowls, Super Bowl XXXV and Super Bowl XXXVIII.) Nantz is also one of two men to host a Super Bowl, announce an NCAA Men's Basketball Championship game, and host coverage of The Masters from Butler Cabin with Brent Musburger being the other. Musburger also accomplished all three feats with CBS. During Super Bowl XLVII, Joe Flacco unknowingly hit Nantz with the Vince Lombardi Trophy during the presentation, but Nantz simply brushed it off.

In 2014, Nantz and broadcast partner Phil Simms called Thursday Night Football games in a deal with CBS and the NFL Network. Tracy Wolfson was the sideline reporter for the Thursday games along with the Sunday games on CBS.

In 2017, former Dallas Cowboys quarterback Tony Romo replaced Phil Simms as Nantz's color commentator for CBS' NFL telecasts.

Nantz and Romo called Super Bowl LIII in 2019, Super Bowl LV in 2021, and Super Bowl LVIII in 2024.

On January 3, 2021, Nantz worked with Boomer Esiason, who filled in for Romo, for a Week 17 game featuring the Arizona Cardinals and Los Angeles Rams. On January 9, 2022, Tom McCarthy filled in for Nantz for a Week 18 game featuring the Carolina Panthers and Tampa Bay Buccaneers. Both Romo in 2021 and Nantz in 2022 had to sit out of the final week of the regular season due to COVID-19 protocols, and Romo also had to work the 2020 Wild Card game between the Chicago Bears and New Orleans Saints remotely for the same reason.

=== Media appearances ===
Nantz has appeared on episodes of The Price Is Right to present a Showcase prize that involves CBS Sports properties, one to attend the 2009 Final Four in Detroit and another in 2010 for Super Bowl XLIV (with Phil Simms), as part of changes to the long-time game show to use product placement models and CBS crossovers, including sports packages. Nantz appeared as himself in the 1996 film Tin Cup and has appeared in episodes of several television series including Arliss, Yes, Dear, Criminal Minds, and How I Met Your Mother (season 5, episode 14 + 15 and season 9, episode 24). He portrayed the announcer for the fictional baseball team in the short-lived series Clubhouse, and his voice can be heard in the 1998 film Scrapple. He also appeared in Fantasy Football, a film produced by CBS' sister network Nickelodeon.

Since 2009, Nantz has guest commentated on the final round of The Open Championship for the BBC, and in 2019, when Fox was broadcasting the U.S. Open at Pebble Beach, Nantz made a guest appearance with fellow broadcaster Joe Buck and called a couple of shots, becoming the only person to commentate at all four of golf's majors.

Nantz teamed with Gary McCord to provide extensive commentary in the 1999 PC golf game Jack Nicklaus 6: Golden Bear Challenge, and his commentary is featured in the Golden Tee Golf arcade game series. From 2012 until 2016 (when they were replaced with Brandon Gaudin and Charles Davis), Nantz, along with Phil Simms, provided commentary for the Madden NFL series. In 2013, Nantz appeared in a Papa John's Pizza ad with Peyton Manning, quarterback of the Denver Broncos, and founder John Schnatter. He has also been part of Capital One's March Madness ad campaign featuring Charles Barkley, Samuel L. Jackson, and Spike Lee.

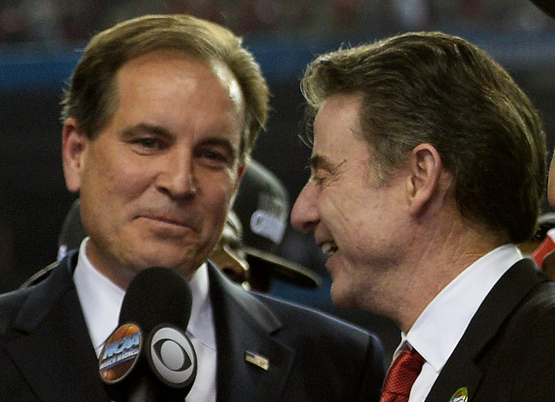
Nantz interviewing Rick Pitino following the 2013 NCAA Division I men's basketball championship game.

=== Career timeline ===
- 1985–1988; 1997: NCAA Football on CBS – studio host
- 1986–present: PGA Tour on CBS (since 1994 as host)
- 1986–1990: College Basketball on CBS – studio host
- 1986–1989: NBA on CBS – play-by-play
- 1987–1990: NFL on CBS Radio – play-by-play
- 1987–1995: US Open (tennis) – play-by-play
- 1989–present: The Masters host
- 1989–1991; 1996–1997: NCAA Football on CBS – lead play-by-play
- 1990–2023: College Basketball on CBS/Turner – lead play-by-play
- 1988–1993; 2004–present: NFL on CBS – play-by-play (1993 as #2; 2004–present as lead)
- 1992 and 1994: Winter Olympics – weekend daytime co-host
- 1994–1995; 2000–2001: Macy's Thanksgiving Day Parade host (under the title "The Thanksgiving Day Parade on CBS")
- 1998–2003: The NFL Today host
- 1998: Olympic Winter Games – primetime host
- 2014–2017: Thursday Night Football – lead play-by-play

== Awards and honors ==
- Two-time Sports Emmy Award winner for Outstanding Sports Personality, Play-by-Play (2009 and 2010).
- Five-time NSMA National Sportscaster of the Year (1998, 2005, 2007, 2008, 2009).
- 2002 Curt Gowdy Award from the Basketball Hall of Fame.
- 2011 Pete Rozelle Radio-Television Award from the Pro Football Hall of Fame.
- 2021 GCSAA Old Tom Morris Award from the Golf Course Superintendents Association of America
- NSMA Hall of Fame inductee (class of 2021)

== Quotes ==
Hello, friends! (Nantz's usual opening line on broadcasts)

=== 1980s ===
And there's no doubt about it, The Bear...has come out of hibernation. (final round of 1986 Masters, referring to Jack Nicklaus)

=== 1990s ===
The Duke of Destiny has won it. For the first time in two decades, college basketball has a repeat champion. (1992 NCAA Basketball Championship Game, Michigan vs. Duke)

Arkansas is in Hog Heaven! (1994 NCAA Basketball Championship Game, Duke vs. Arkansas)

There it is! A win for the ages! (Nantz calling Tiger Woods’ first Masters Victory in 1997)

Good-looking putt...Mark O'Meara has won the Masters! (1998 Masters, as O'Meara made the tournament-winning birdie on the final hole)

Just when people say you can't, you can, and U-CONN has won the national championship in its first attempt in a final! (1999 NCAA Basketball Championship Game, Connecticut vs. Duke)

=== 2000s ===
Gators with a chance to win it...will Cinderella arrive? Miller in the lane, puts it up...[buzzer sounds] Florida wins! Florida wins! Mike Miller with the winner at the buzzer! (2000 NCAA Tournament First Round game, 5-seed Florida defeats 12-seed Butler in overtime)

Is it his time?...Yes!..At long last! (2004 Masters, as Phil Mickelson made the tournament-winning shot for his first major)

It started in March, ended in April, and belonged to May (2005 NCAA Tournament)

The March to the Arch belongs to Michigan State in double overtime! (2005 NCAA Men's Basketball Division I Austin Regional Final)

Gators... as good as it gets! (2006 NCAA Tournament), Florida's first basketball title in program history

A tradition unlike any other, The Masters on CBS. (Used annually during promos for and coverage of the tournament, although not always by Nantz)

...and now Luke Donald trying to solve this piece of geometry." (Donald reading a putt at The 2007 PGA)

A Kansas comeback for the history books, Rock Chalk, Championship! Kansas takes the title! (2008 NCAA Tournament)

Y.E. YES... Y. E. Yang has won the PGA Championship!" -- Nantz as Y.E. Yang hits his birdie putt to defeat Tiger Woods and win the 2009 PGA Championship.

=== 2010s ===
That's a win for the family. (As Phil Mickelson seals the 2010 Masters with a birdie on the 18th hole)

Everyone talked about the dog fight coming in, right? Huskies and Bulldogs. But one thing was very clear tonight, here in Houston. Connecticut wins best in show! (UConn clinching the 2011 NCAA Tournament)

(Aaron Rodgers) turned 32 yesterday, does he have a vintage moment in him? In the end zone... it is caught for the win! Richard Rodgers with a walk-off touchdown! A game-ender for the Packers! (Miracle in Motown, 2015 NFL Thursday night game, Green Bay Packers @ Detroit Lions)

Gives it to Jenkins! For the Championship… YES!!! Villanova! Phenomenal! The national champions, with Jenkins hitting the winner at the buzzer! (2016 national championship game between Villanova and North Carolina)

Superlatives you can't come up with enough. Absolute, incredible performance. [time expires] Shock and awe in college basketball! UMBC makes history in Charlotte! (Nantz at the end of the game as University of Maryland, Baltimore County Retrievers became the first #16 seed to defeat a #1 and advance to the second round, as they defeated the Virginia Cavaliers 74–54 in the biggest upset in NCAA Tournament history. Top seeded teams were previously 135–0 against #16.)

And Virginia, with the all-time turnaround title! (Nantz calling the end of the 2019 National Championship game, with the redemption-seeking Virginia Cavaliers cutting the nets. It was Virginia's first national championship in program history, and it capped off what is considered one of the greatest redemption stories in sports history, taking place a year after the aformentioned loss to the 16th-seeded UMBC Retrievers.)

Waited for years, many doubted we'd ever see it, but here it is.. [Tiger Woods sinks the Masters-winning putt in the 18th hole, crowd roars] the return to glory! (Nantz calling Tiger Woods' win at the 2019 Masters Tournament, his first major win since the 2008 U.S. Open, and first green jacket since 2005.)

=== 2020s ===
Gonzaga has time to do something. Suggs for the win…OH YES!! OH YES!! UNBELIEVABLE! UNBELIEVABLE! The perfect season remains on go! (2021 Final Four between Gonzaga and UCLA)

Scheffler outshines them all! (Nantz calling Scottie Scheffler’s first Masters victory in 2022)

Comes down to one last play and it's gonna be... getting longer by the second. You're all the way back at the 30-yard-line. Now you can step into it. Here comes the Hail Mary with the game on the line… And the ball is caught! Caught! It's a miracle! It's Noah Brown! Oh my goodness! This town is going crazy! It's a madhouse in Landover, Maryland! (Calling the Hail Maryland when Jayden Daniels completed a Hail Mary pass to Noah Brown that was tipped by Tyrique Stevenson with no time left on the clock)

Nantz: The clock is running, with fifteen seconds left and third and 26, they have one timeout left [...] You better hurry! (Tony Romo: Oh no... Jim no!) This is disaster in the making here. You're going to have to do something. Well it comes down to this play... incomplete and the game is over! Completely botched at the end by the Bears. (Romo: I can't believe they didn't take a timeout. You just assumed they would have taken...) They're looking around like 'What just happened?' (Romo: They had a timeout left!) Nantz: The clock has struck zero and it is over. They took way too long to get in position to run this play. This had no intention of being their final play. (Romo: Oh my goodness...) They would have had an attempt at a field goal to send it to overtime from about 59 yards. (Calling the end of the 2024 Chicago Bears–Detroit Lions Thanksgiving game where poor clock management by the Bears results in their sixth straight loss and the firing of Matt Eberflus the following day, becoming the first Bears' head coach to be fired mid-season)

The long journey is over! McIlroy has his Masterpiece! (Following Rory McIlroy's winning putt to win the 2025 Masters Tournament and complete the career grand slam.)

== Personal life ==
Nantz's first book, Always By My Side – A Father's Grace and a Sports Journey Unlike Any Other, was released in May 2008. Nantz tells personal stories from football, basketball, and golf, and how he has met people along the way who remind him of the virtues his father instilled in him. The foreword in the book was written by his friend and frequent golf partner, former President George H. W. Bush. Nantz's father, Jim Nantz Jr., died in 2008 after being diagnosed with Alzheimer's disease; he was treated at Houston Methodist Hospital in Houston, Texas. In January 2011, Nantz and Houston Methodist Hospital launched the Nantz National Alzheimer Center. The mission of the center is to improve care and treatment for patients with Alzheimer's disease through the advancement of research and the investigation of its causes, including the role of concussions and other past neurological trauma.

Nantz was married to Ann-Lorraine "Lorrie" Carlsen Nantz for 26 years before divorcing in 2009. The couple lived in Westport, Connecticut, and had one child, daughter Caroline. In November 2009, Nantz was ordered to pay his ex-wife $916,000 a year in child support and alimony. Nantz acknowledged dating a 29-year-old woman before the divorce was final, although the judge concluded the marriage deteriorated years earlier and "this remote event in no way contributed to the breakdown of the marriage." Nantz was said to earn $7 million in 2009.

On June 9, 2012, Nantz married Courtney Richards in a ceremony at the Pebble Beach Golf Links in Pebble Beach, California, specifically at the tee of the course's famed seventh hole. Nantz and his wife have a daughter born in 2014 and a son born in 2016. Nantz and his family used to live in a home overlooking the Pebble Beach Links that he bought in October 2011. The home's most notable feature is a 50%-scale replica of the seventh hole at Pebble Beach, located in the backyard. The backyard hole is a popular spot for visiting golfers, sports luminaries, and other celebrities. Visitors who make a hole-in-one have their names inscribed on a rock that stands next to the tee box. Nantz and his family moved to Nashville, Tennessee in 2021.

=== Winemaking ===
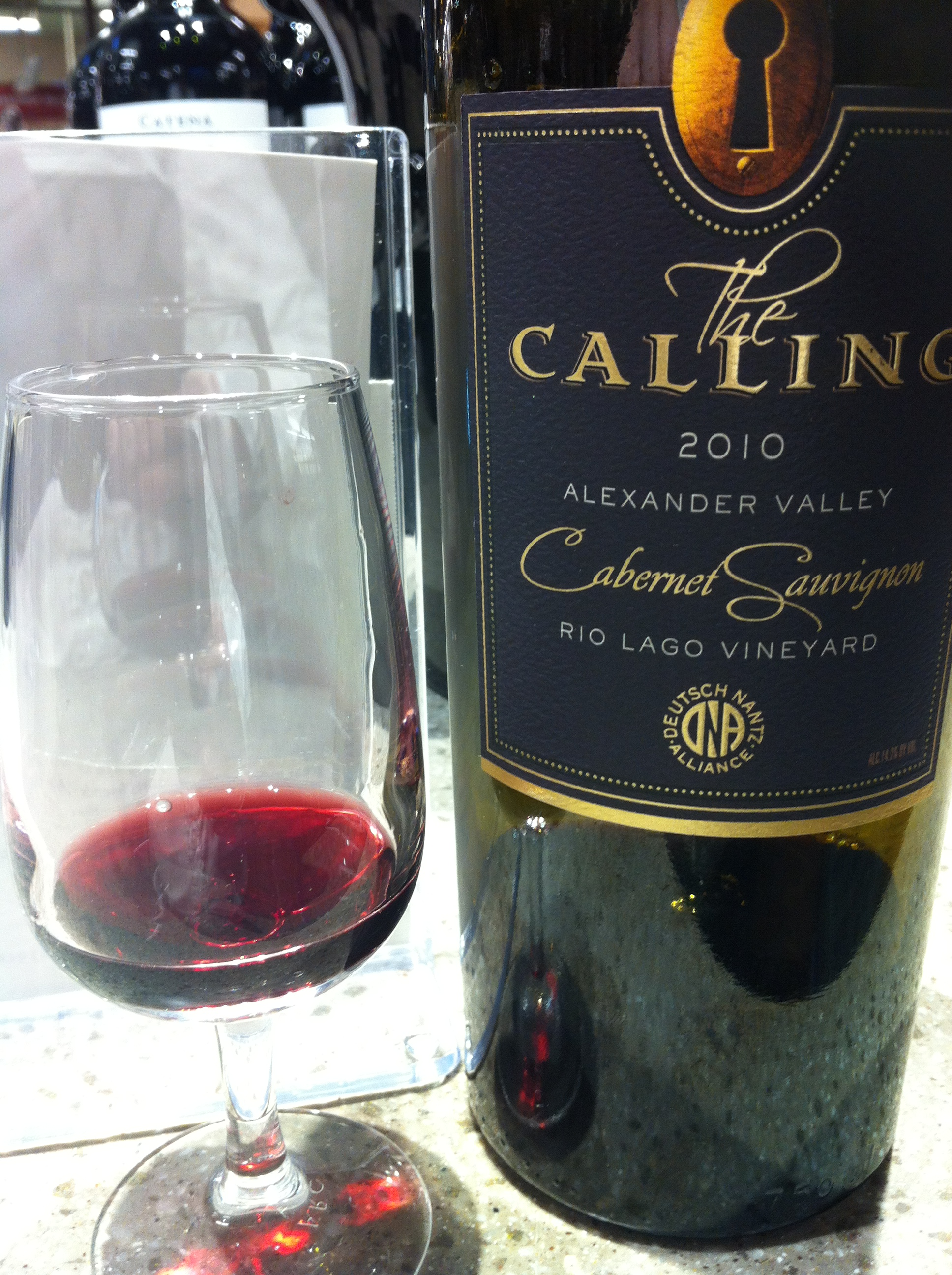
Cabernet Sauvignon from the Alexander Valley produced for Nantz's The Calling label.

In 2009, Nantz partnered with wine producer Peter Deutsch to launch a private wine label The Calling with its first vintage released in 2012. The wine's name is in reference to Nantz's calling of the Masters Tournament.

== See also ==
- List of celebrities who own wineries and vineyards

Media offices
| Preceded by Dick Stockton | Studio host, College Basketball on CBS; 1986–1990 | Succeeded by Pat O'Brien |
| Preceded by Brent Musburger | Play-by-play announcer, NCAA Men's Final Four; 1991–2023 | Succeeded by Ian Eagle |
| Preceded by Greg Gumbel | American television prime time anchor, Winter Olympic Games; 1998 | Succeeded by Bob Costas |
| Preceded by Greg Gumbel | The NFL Today host 1998–2003 | Succeeded by Greg Gumbel |
| Preceded by Greg Gumbel | Lead play-by-play announcer, The NFL on CBS; 2004–present | Succeeded by Incumbent |
| Preceded by Greg Gumbel | Super Bowl television play-by-play announcer (AFC package carrier); 2007–present | Succeeded by Incumbent |
| Preceded by Brad Nessler | Thursday Night Football lead play-by-play 2014–2017, shared with Al Michaels (2016) and Mike Tirico (2017) | Succeeded by Joe Buck |
