= EA Sports College Football 25 =

2024 video game

- Standard edition cover art featuring Quinn Ewers, Travis Hunter, and Donovan Edwards at the Cotton Bowl in Dallas, Texas
- Developer: EA Orlando
- Publisher: EA Sports
- Composer: Kris Bowers (Theme)
- Series: EA Sports College Football
- Engine: Frostbite
- Platforms: PlayStation 5 Xbox Series X/S
- Release: July 19, 2024
- Genre: Sports
- Modes: Single-player, multiplayer

EA Sports College Football 25 is a video game based on college football, developed by EA Orlando and published by EA Sports. It is a part of the EA Sports College Football game series and the first such game in eleven years since NCAA Football 14 in 2013.

The game received generally positive reviews and became the best-selling sports video game in US history based on dollar sales.

== Development ==
Following the release of the series' previous entry in 2013, Electronic Arts (EA) settled a lawsuit brought by former college football players who argued their name, image and, likeness (NIL) were used without permission or compensation. The National Collegiate Athletic Association (NCAA), whose brand was licensed by EA, had a history of resisting attempts to financially compensate its athletes. As a part of the settlement, EA announced it would stop producing college football video games.

On February 2, 2021, EA Sports announced that the series NCAA Football would return under the name EA Sports College Football, stating on Twitter, "For those who never stopped believing...College Football is coming back." They also released a statement on their website announcing that they had garnered and are utilizing a partnership with the Collegiate Licensing Company, an NCAA licensing group, to bring uniforms, stadiums, traditions and more from over 100 NCAA-affiliated sports teams. At the time, that meant that teams not part of the CLC would not be in the game such as Air Force, Army, Georgia State, Kentucky, New Mexico, Notre Dame, Troy and USC.

The game, which was not under development prior to EA Sports' announcement of the new title, was developed in Orlando, Florida, by EA Orlando (named EA Tiburon at the time). The company claimed that a revival of the NCAA Football franchise was one of their most requested games as of the time of their announcement of EA Sports College Football, and The Motley Fool projects that College Football sales could rival those of that year's Madden release. However, doubts were raised as to whether or not the game's reception will exceed that of recent Madden releases, which are held in low regard by the Madden gaming community.

Initially, player names and likenesses were not to be included in the game. Because of this, several schools, including Notre Dame, Tulane and Northwestern refused to join the game until NIL rules were finalized. EA Sports responded by stating "player name, image and likeness is not currently planned for the game. However, we are watching the developments in this area closely and are prepared to take steps to include players should that opportunity arise." At the time, the NCAA had delayed and not voted on new NIL rules, but over two dozen states had either passed or proposed laws so that institutions couldn't enforce the NCAA's NIL rules. The 2021 United States Supreme Court case NCAA. v. Alston deemed the NCAA's precedent of avoiding compensating athletes impermissible. Following the ruling, the NCAA reversed its position, creating rules for likeness compensation.

On November 22, 2022, in an interview with ESPN.com's Michael Rothstein, EA Sports vice president and general manager Daryl Holt stated that Electronic Arts would release the game sometime in summer 2024. "That's the best date for us to bring the game that we think is going to meet or exceed our player expectations...and cover the breadth and scale of what we want in the game. We're trying to build a very immersive college football experience," Holt said.

In 2023, after the implementation of these changes, EA announced that player likenesses would be featured in their next college football game.

The game was developed using the Frostbite engine.

== Release ==
College Football 25 was pitched to EA Sports by Daryl Holt, their current senior vice president and group general manager, in December 2019, being greenlit for development shortly after. In February 2021, EA publicly announced that the College Football series would return. EA Orlando, developers of the Madden NFL series, was announced to be creating the game. On February 15, 2024, EA confirmed the game's title as EA Sports College Football 25 and revealed a trailer for it, promising to provide further information in May 2024.

On February 22, 2024, EA Sports announced that all 134 Football Bowl Subdivision (FBS) programs would be featured in EA Sports College Football 25 but the 128 Football Championship Subdivision (FCS) programs would not be included at launch. That same day, ESPN's lead college football commentary team of Chris Fowler and Kirk Herbstreit announced that they would be featured as commentators. Herbstreit was a commentator in EA's original NCAA Football series until its hiatus after NCAA Football 14. ESPN studio host Kevin Connors confirmed his involvement on X (Twitter) the same day, along with ESPN College Football studio and game analyst Jesse Palmer, Rece Davis, and former College GameDay analyst David Pollack.

By early March 2024, EA had secured NIL opt-ins from over 10,000 athletes. Similarly, the Heisman Trophy and the various bowls will appear in the game, but the National College Football Awards Association requested that their awards and trophies not be included; the Lou Groza Award is the coalition's only honor to opt into the game.

On May 16, 2024, EA Sports revealed the main cover of the game, featuring Quinn Ewers, quarterback for the Texas Longhorns, Travis Hunter, wide receiver and defensive back for the Colorado Buffaloes, and Donovan Edwards, running back for the Michigan Wolverines, and officially confirmed the game would release on July 19, 2024, with early access for Deluxe Edition owners starting July 15, ahead of its gameplay reveal trailer the following day. Following the release of the trailer, EA Sports confirmed that many of its old features from NCAA Football 14 would be brought to College Football 25 such as Team Builder, Road to Glory, and Dynasty. The gameplay deep dive that released on May 31 unveiled features such as "CampusIQ," the gameplay system, which encompasses three fundamental pillars: "All 22+" which highlights the importance of individual players and their unique abilities, "134 ways to play," meaning that every team has their own unique playbook, and "Stories of Saturday," which seeks to encapsulate the raw emotions of these student athletes as they perform under intense pressure in hostile environments, put simply, a freshman responding far differently than a senior.

On June 28, 2024, EA Sports revealed its top 25 overall team power rankings, and on July 2, 2024, Dynasty was revealed.

A 21-minute gameplay trailer was premiered on July 8, 2024, featuring YouTuber Bordeaux and cover athlete Donovan Edwards. They played two games, with Edwards winning both with raw gameplay being revealed soon after. As well as the trailer, the day after, an Ultimate Team Deep Dive was posted. However, unlike previous deep dives, this one was posted only to their official website. Following the same set, the Road to Glory Deep Dive released on July 11, 2024.

On July 12, 2024, YouTubers and Twitch Streamers who are in EA's Creator Network program got access to a nearly final edition of the game, in which rebuilds, player careers, and raw gameplay were shortly uploaded and streamed on YouTube, Twitch, and other platforms. The worldwide release was on July 19.

== Soundtrack ==
The College Football 25 main soundtrack consists of covers of college fight songs credited to the EA Sports College Football Marching Band. An original main theme, "Campus Clash", was composed for the video game by composer Kris Bowers.

The drum cadences appearing in the video game are performed by the drumline of the Blue Devils Drum and Bugle Corps, as licensed from their 2020 album Bang to Rights.

Other licensed music appearing in College Football 25 includes "Sandstorm", "Mo Bamba", "Kernkraft 400", "Welcome to the Jungle", "Wave on Wave", and an instrumental of "Talkin' Out the Side of Your Neck". Notably absent are the songs "Enter Sandman" and "Jump Around" (associated with Virginia Tech and Wisconsin respectively) as EA failed to acquire the licenses for these songs.

== Reception ==
Reception

Aggregate score
Aggregator	Score
Metacritic	(PS5) 83/100 (XSXS) 80/100

Review scores
Publication	Score
Game Informer	8.5/10
GameSpot	8/10
GamesRadar+	4.5/5 stars
IGN	7/10

EA Sports College Football 25 received "generally favorable" reviews according to review aggregator website Metacritic.

IGN gave the game a 7/10, praising the gameplay but criticizing the lack of depth in the core game modes. GameSpot rated the game an 8/10, noting that the game had strong presentation and atmosphere but critiquing the Road to Glory game mode.

=== Sales ===
At launch, the game attracted more than 2.8 million players, 2.2 million of whom purchased the Deluxe Edition, which allowed players to access the game three days earlier than other players. By November 2024, the game had become the best-selling sports video game in the US of all time based on dollar sales.

=== Accolades ===
Year	Ceremony	Category	Result	Ref.
2024	Golden Joystick Awards	Best Multiplayer Game	Nominated	
2025	New York Game Awards	Big Apple Award for Best Game of the Year	Nominated	
2025	28th Annual D.I.C.E. Awards	Sports Game of the Year	Nominated	
