= She's Strange (song) =

Single by Cameo

from the album She's Strange
- B-side: "Tribute to Bob Marley"
- Released: 1984
- Genre: Funk
- Length: 7:12 (album version); 3:47 (single version)
- Label: Atlanta Artists
- Songwriters: Larry Blackmon; Tomi Jenkins; Nathan Leftenant; Charlie Singleton
- Producer: Larry Blackmon

Cameo singles chronology
"Slow Movin'" (1983)	"She's Strange" (1984)	"Talkin' Out the Side of Your Neck" (1984)

Music video
- "She's Strange" on YouTube

"She's Strange" is a song by American funk band Cameo, released in 1984 as a single from their tenth studio album, She's Strange. The single was their first to top the R&B chart, hitting number one for four weeks in April 1984. The single was the band's first to reach the Billboard Hot 100 pop chart, peaking at number forty-seven.

The music video for the song was directed by Dieter Trattmann.

== Charts ==
=== Weekly charts ===
Chart (1984)	Peak position
UK Singles (OCC)	37
US Billboard Hot 100	47
US Hot R&B/Hip-Hop Songs (Billboard)	1

=== Year-end charts ===
Chart (1984)	Position
US Hot R&B/Hip-Hop Songs (Billboard)	4

== See also ==
- List of Hot Black Singles number ones of 1984
