= NCAA Football 13 =

2012 video game

- Game artwork featuring Robert Griffin III and Barry Sanders
- Developer: EA Tiburon
- Publisher: EA Sports
- Platforms: PlayStation 3, Xbox 360
- Release: July 10, 2012
- Genre: Sports
- Modes: Single-player, multiplayer

NCAA Football 13 is an American football video game published by EA Sports and developed by EA Tiburon. It is the successor to NCAA Football 12 in the NCAA Football series. NCAA Football 13 is the predecessor to NCAA Football 14.

== Cover ==
On February 27, 2012, it was announced that former Baylor quarterback and 2011 Heisman Trophy winner Robert Griffin III will be the cover athlete for the game. The cover also features past Heisman Trophy winner Barry Sanders. A fan vote beginning March 12 allowed fans to choose between Oklahoma State running back Barry Sanders, Southern California halfback Marcus Allen, Boston College quarterback Doug Flutie, Michigan wide receiver and return specialist Desmond Howard, Florida State quarterback Charlie Ward, Houston quarterback Andre Ware, Ohio State running back Eddie George, and Georgia running back Herschel Walker to appear on the cover alongside Griffin III.

== Rule changes ==
NCAA Football 13 includes two rule changes which took effect in NCAA Division I (A) FBS games in the 2012–13 season. The first rule change is the location of the ball on kickoffs, where the ball was moved up 5 yards, in conjunction with NFL kickoff standards which took effect in the 2011–12 season. Players also need to stay within 5 yards of the ball on kickoff to prevent a running head start. The second rule change affected kickoffs and other free kicks where if a player gets a touchback the ball will start on the 25 yard line instead of the 20.

== Gameplay ==
A number of gameplay enhancements and improvements were implemented in NCAA Football 13. Among those are enhancements to the Quarterback position including: 20 new quarterback dropbacks, 25 pass trajectory zones (compared to 1 the year before), a number of Quarterback sack avoidance moves, 430 new pass animations and more (not including the others from previous years). Also on offense, wide receivers now have better awareness, where icons will now show the level of readiness a receiver has as they look for the ball. On defense, players were supposed to now have to see the ball to make a move and will no longer be able to make "blind swats, a feature that ultimately was not completely added to the game, as blind swats and interceptions still occur, although they are less common." A new feature in the game is "Reaction Time", which is available in "Road to Glory" and "Heisman Challenge", where the player can hold down the left trigger to slow down the game, which allows players to have time to decide what to do. The game also allows to return kicks and punts.

In "Road to Glory", users can create new players and coaches to track their careers. Players start in high school, and they can select up to five colleges of interest. Coaches can start out as offensive coordinator, defensive coordinator or head coach, and may elect to accept or decline coaching offers at other colleges as their careers progress. High school names, teams, stadiums and colors can be customized by the user, and new high schools can be added through the game's online feature.

Exporting draft classes to Madden NFL was removed in this version of the game, due to compatibility issues with Madden NFL 13.

== New teams ==
Three new NCAA Football Bowl Subdivision (FBS) teams were added to NCAA Football 13: Massachusetts (UMass), Texas–San Antonio (UTSA), and Texas State. UTSA and Texas State will be joining the Western Athletic Conference (WAC) for the 2012 season, while UMass will join the Mid-American Conference (MAC). South Alabama joined the FBS in 2012, but was not included in the game. This game simulates the NCAA Football Bowl Subdivision, starting in 2012

== Reception ==
Reception

Review scores
Publication	Score
G4	3.5/5
GameSpot	6.5/10
GameTrailers	8.2/10
IGN	8/10
Joystiq	3/5

The game received mainly positive reviews, but received a lower score from IGN than NCAA Football 12, earning an 8/10, claiming that the game is too similar to NCAA Football 12.

== See also ==
- Madden NFL 13
- NCAA Football 14
