= Madden NFL 13 =

2012 video game

- Cover art featuring Calvin Johnson
- Developer: EA Tiburon
- Publisher: EA Sports
- Composer: Colin O'Malley
- Series: Madden NFL
- Engine: Infinity (excluding the Wii U, PlayStation Vita and the Wii ports)
- Platforms: PlayStation 3 PlayStation Vita; Wii; Wii U Xbox 360 iOS
- Release: NA: August 28, 2012; AS: August 28, 2012 (PS3, Vita, X360); AU: August 30, 2012 (PS3, X360); EU: August 31, 2012 (PS3, X360); iOS: NA: November 1, 2012; Wii U: NA: November 18, 2012
- Genre: Sports
- Modes: Single-player; Multiplayer

Madden NFL 13 is an American football video game based on the National Football League, developed by EA Tiburon and published by EA Sports. The 23rd installment of the Madden NFL series, the game was released in 2012 for PlayStation 3, PlayStation Vita, Wii, Wii U, Xbox 360, and iOS.

EA's Chief Creative Officer, Richard Hilleman, said that defense would receive various changes in mechanics and controls, one of the first known changes in the game. For the first time in the series, the game was officially released in Brazil, due to the explosive growth of the sport in the country.

This was the last Madden game to be released on the Wii, the first and only to be released on the Wii U and PlayStation Vita, and the final in the series to be available for non-mobile phone handhelds. It was the last Madden title available on a Nintendo console until Madden NFL 26 on the Nintendo Switch 2 in 2025. It was the first game of the series since Madden NFL 2002 to not feature EA Trax and instead only had instrumental music, which was met with criticism.

A 64-player fan vote tournament to determine the cover athlete began on March 7, 2012. The vote-in round matched up a pair of teammates from each of the 32 NFL teams, the winners of which were seeded in a 32-player bracket. The cover features Calvin Johnson of the Detroit Lions.

== New features ==
=== Presentation ===
- The NFL on CBS commentary crew of Jim Nantz and Phil Simms take the role as game announcers in the game.
  - Nantz and Simms appear in an in-booth cutscene prior to the game, including stadium-specific backgrounds.
- EA introduced 200+ new cutscenes between plays, games, etc. The cutscenes are inspired by different TV presentations, and were overhauled for dramatic effect.
- There is no halftime show, instead being replaced by a stats overlay.
- The game contains all the new Nike home/away uniforms, including alternates on the disc. Additional uniforms were unlockable by code as they were released in real life.
- Lighting changes based on the time of day occur per play instead of just at quarter breaks.
- Madden NFL 13 features the improved high dynamic range lighting and motion blur of NCAA Football 13.
- Ray Lewis appears in the introduction that features his real-life moments and shots taken from the game.

=== Passing game ===
- EA Sports improved the left-analog stick passing controls so that the player can place the ball on a receiver's back shoulder, out toward the sideline, etc. where only the receiver can receive it.
- New pass trajectories and ball speeds open up even more areas of the field for passing game.
- New pass animations speed up the time in which quarterbacks get rid of the ball, including a new shovel pass and specific set-ups for throws on the run.
- Pump fakes are now directed toward specific receivers, occur faster, and contain specific animations when performed outside of the pocket.
- Like NCAA 13, Madden features more than 20 new quarterback dropbacks, including those for 1/3/5/7-step variations, screens, and plays with auto-pump fake dropbacks.
- To improve the receiving, EA is including more than 430 new catch animations, some of which are fueled in part by the changes made to the left-analog passing stick. EA Tiburon says it also wants to make user catches easier to do by slowing down players when they select a receiver.
- The quarterbacks have new moves for avoiding the pass rush. A slowed down pocket speed gives the player more control when trying to avoid getting sacked.
- EA tweaked play-action to include an abort command that cancels the animation for those situations where a defender is barreling in unabated. The play-action also unravels faster in general. Running backs should be better in blocking after the fake (as well as release for passes) and defenders would be faked out more by play-action.
- Receivers have timing windows in their routes. When they expect the ball they'll turn their head to the quarterback. Until this time, their passing icons are grayed out. Passing to a receiver who wasn't expecting the ball often resulted in an incompletion. However, receivers would sometimes look for the ball earlier if the cornerback across the line of scrimmage blitzes or the receiver beats the jam at the line.

=== AI ===
- Neither receivers nor defensive backs react to a ball unless they are expecting it (like in the case of a quick slant for receivers) or they have their heads turned and are looking at it.
- Defenses line-up opposite receivers in a best-on-best designation. This prevents the linebacker from matching up against an elite wide receiver lined up in the slot, for instance.
- Defenses disguise their man or zone coverage before the snap so offenses can't try to use motion to uncover the defense's plans.
- Defenders use different coverage techniques such as off coverage (where they start seven or so yards off the line of scrimmage and attempt to read the ball), trail techniques (including hand fighting), and split techniques (where the linebacker stands between the tight end and slot receiver).
- New animations allow for simultaneous tackles while the ball is being caught (including being able to knock out the ball in mid-air), and in general the development team says it's been working on the interplay between players while the ball is in the air.
- EA promises enhanced AI playcalling for two-minute drill, goal line, clock draining, and red zone situations.
- New Infinity Engine improves tackle animations and the outcome of player interactions including a balance system.

=== Audio ===
- Over 82 hours of commentary from Nantz and Simms, to keep the audio new and different each time, with over 9,000 unique lines. Most of the lines are ad-libbed and Nantz and Simms regularly have interactions and comment on what is actually happening on the field.
- A new "Madden NFL 13 Theme", composed by Colin O'Malley, to be played at the beginning of the game as well as variations heard at quarter breaks, halftime, and postgame. In addition, an approx. 15-16 track, fully orchestrated soundtrack, also composed by O'Malley, replaced EA Trax for the music on the menu screens and other game modes.
- Partnership with NFL Films to get exclusive sound clips, such as QB cadences, hits/tackles, and group chatter.
- New crowd noise, recorded with 24 microphones, opposed to 4 microphones in previous years.

=== Other ===
- Special teams coverage has been modified to prevent player clustering. EA also integrated cover and lane logic, new formations, and better wedges on returns.
- Madden's control scheme matches the control scheme on NCAA Football series.
- Kinect is now included on the Xbox 360 version.
- The Wii U version is slightly different from the other releases as the Infinity Engine is not present. The game is otherwise the same.
- Tim Tebow's "Tebowing", Victor Cruz's "Salsa Dance", Rob Gronkowski's "Gronk Spike", and Cam Newton's "Superman taunt" were included in the game.
- Players can now wear the Riddell TK and Wilson F2000 helmets, which do not have facemasks on them.
- Connected Careers: Combines Franchise, Online Franchise, and Superstar modes as well as historic players into one gameplay option. It also removed the option to import draft classes from NCAA Football, do a fantasy draft, play co-operatively on one team during a game or control multiple teams throughout the Connected Career.

== SportsNation cover vote tournament ==
After the success of the Madden NFL 12 cover vote, EA Sports again teamed up with ESPN's fan polling show SportsNation to bring the tournament back for this year's installment. The tournament began with a 64-player vote-in round, during which fans were able to select from two players representing each NFL team. The teammates went head-to-head in a voting competition to see which player would qualify for the actual tournament bracket. By the end of the 64-player vote-in round, the number of competitors was cut down to 32 players, with one player from each team. Due to offseason player movement, however, the New York Jets and New England Patriots began the tournament with two players, while the Denver Broncos and St. Louis Rams were unrepresented. This occurred because during the vote-in round (March 7–21) Tim Tebow was traded by the Broncos to the Jets after Denver acquired Peyton Manning, and Brandon Lloyd left the Rams to sign with the Patriots. Both Tebow and Lloyd, who had previously been teammates in Denver, were eliminated in the first round. The initial bracket featured 3 players who had previously appeared on the cover of Madden (no player has been featured twice): Drew Brees of the New Orleans Saints (11), Troy Polamalu of the Pittsburgh Steelers (10), and Larry Fitzgerald of the Arizona Cardinals (who appeared with Polamalu on the cover of 10). Fitzgerald eliminated Polamalu in the first round, while Brees was eliminated by the Ravens' Ray Rice in the second round.

Of the eight defensive players in the initial bracket, only San Francisco 49ers linebacker Patrick Willis, cornerback Darrelle Revis of the Jets, and defensive end Jared Allen of the Minnesota Vikings advanced to the second round. Only Willis advanced to the third round, with Revis being eliminated by Victor Cruz of the Giants and Allen by Rob Gronkowski of the Patriots. No offensive linemen made the initial bracket, with only one appearing in the 64-player vote-in round (Joe Thomas of the Cleveland Browns, who was beaten out by teammate Joe Haden). Punter Shane Lechler and kicker Sebastian Janikowski, both of the Oakland Raiders were the only special teams players in the tournament; Janikowski advanced to the 32-player bracket where he was eliminated by the Jaguars' Maurice Jones-Drew.

Carolina Panthers' quarterback Cam Newton has received more votes than any other player in each of the first two rounds (over 500,000 in the first round, over 870,000 total), winning 87% of the vote over running back LeGarrette Blount of the Tampa Bay Buccaneers in the first round and 83% over San Diego Chargers tight end Antonio Gates in the second. The only upset by seed in the first round was Willis (an 11-seed) winning 62% of the vote over Chicago Bears running back Matt Forte (a 6-seed). Willis knocked off another higher-seeded running back in the second round, 3-seed Maurice Jones-Drew. Two other upsets occurred in the second round with Ray Rice (5-seed) narrowly defeating Drew Brees (4-seed) and Calvin Johnson of the Detroit Lions (6-seed) taking down Arian Foster of the Houston Texans (3-seed). The final voting featured QB Cam Newton and WR Calvin Johnson. Calvin Johnson was eventually named the winner, beating out Cam Newton 52% to 48%.

Tournament Bracket

Round of 32 (March 21–28)
1	Cam Newton (CAR)	87%
16	LeGarrette Blount (TB)	13%
8	Antonio Gates (SD)	55%
9	Dwight Freeney (IND)	45%
5	LeSean McCoy (PHI)	68%
12	Reggie Bush (MIA)	32%
4	Larry Fitzgerald (ARI)	72%
13	Troy Polamalu (PIT)	28%
6	Matt Forté (CHI)	38%
11	Patrick Willis (SF)	62%
3	Maurice Jones-Drew (JAX)	64%
14	Sebastian Janikowski (OAK)	36%
7	Darrelle Revis (NYJ)	60%
10	Stevie Johnson (BUF)	40%
2	Victor Cruz (NYG)	82%
15	Brian Orakpo (WAS)	18%
1	Aaron Rodgers (GB)	79%
16	Joe Haden (CLE)	21%
8	Marshawn Lynch (SEA)	71%
9	Chris Johnson (TEN)	29%
5	Ray Rice (BAL)	65%
12	A. J. Green (CIN)	35%
4	Drew Brees (NO)	78%
13	Matt Ryan (ATL)	22%
6	Calvin Johnson (DET)	92%
11	Dwayne Bowe (KC)	8%
3	Arian Foster (HOU)	54%
14	Tim Tebow (NYJ) ^{[a]}	46%
7	Jared Allen (MIN)	58%
10	DeMarcus Ware (DAL)	42%
2	Rob Gronkowski (NE)	85%
15	Brandon Lloyd (NE) ^{[b]}	15%

Round of 16 (March 28-April 4)
1	Cam Newton (CAR)	83%
8	Antonio Gates (SD)	17%
5	LeSean McCoy (PHI)	46%
4	Larry Fitzgerald (ARI)	54%
11	Patrick Willis (SF)	58%
3	Maurice Jones-Drew (JAX)	42%
7	Darrelle Revis (NYJ)	38%
2	Victor Cruz (NYG)	62%
1	Aaron Rodgers (GB)	64%
8	Marshawn Lynch (SEA)	36%
5	Ray Rice (BAL)	51%
4	Drew Brees (NO)	49%
6	Calvin Johnson (DET)	73%
3	Arian Foster (HOU)	27%
7	Jared Allen (MIN)	35%
2	Rob Gronkowski (NE)	65%

Quarter-finals (April 4–11)
1	Cam Newton (CAR)	70%
4	Larry Fitzgerald (ARI)	30%
11	Patrick Willis (SF)	55%
2	Victor Cruz (NYG)	45%
1	Aaron Rodgers (GB)	55%
5	Ray Rice (BAL)	45%
6	Calvin Johnson (DET)	63%
2	Rob Gronkowski (NE)	37%

Semi-finals (April 11–18)
1	Cam Newton (CAR)	53%
11	Patrick Willis (SF)	47%
1	Aaron Rodgers (GB)	33%
6	Calvin Johnson (DET)	67%

Final (April 18–25)
1	Cam Newton (CAR)	48%
6	Calvin Johnson (DET)	52%

Notes

- ^{a1} Tebow was traded from the Broncos to the Jets during the 64-player vote-in round.
- ^{b1} Lloyd became a free agent and was signed by the Patriots during the 64-player vote-in round.

== Soundtrack ==
Madden NFL 13 uses an original orchestrated score composed by Colin O'Malley, as opposed to licensed songs. The move was met with some criticism from fans and critics, who cited the franchise's inclusion of songs as a staple of the series. The original orchestrated score by O'Malley was later added back in Madden NFL 18, and was available in Madden NFL 19 and Madden NFL 20.

== Reception ==
Reception

Aggregate scores
Aggregator	Score
GameRankings	(PS3) 83.57% (X360) 83.49% (Wii U) 75.30% (Wii) 72.50% (Vita) 63.33%
Metacritic	(PS3) 83/100 (X360) 81/100 (Wii U) 75/100 (Wii) 73/100 (Vita) 63/100

Review scores
Publication	Score
Destructoid	8/10
Electronic Gaming Monthly	8/10
Eurogamer	8/10
Game Informer	8.25/10
GameRevolution	4/5
GameSpot	7.5/10 (Vita) 5.5/10
GameTrailers	8.2/10
Giant Bomb	3/5
IGN	9/10 (Wii U) 8.3/10 (Vita) 6/10
Joystiq	4/5
Nintendo Power	(Wii U) 8/10 (Wii) 6.5/10
Official Xbox Magazine (US)	7.5/10
Polygon	8/10
PlayStation: The Official Magazine	(PS3) 9/10 (Vita) 7/10

The game was met with positive to mixed reception. GameRankings and Metacritic gave it a score of 83.57% and 83 out of 100 for the PlayStation 3 version; 83.49% and 81 out of 100 for the Xbox 360 version; 75.30% and 75 out of 100 for the Wii U version; 72.50% and 73 out of 100 for the Wii version; and 63.33% and 63 out of 100 for the PlayStation Vita version.

Kotaku praised Connected Careers, but criticized the Kinect voice support.

The game sold more than 1.6 million copies.

== See also ==
- NCAA Football 13
