= NCAA Football 14 =

2014 football video game

- NCAA Football 14 game artwork featuring Denard Robinson.
- Developer: EA Tiburon
- Publisher: EA Sports
- Director: Jeffrey Luhr
- Producer: Jason French
- Series: NCAA Football
- Platforms: PlayStation 3, Xbox 360
- Release: July 9, 2013
- Genre: American football simulation
- Modes: Single-player, multiplayer

NCAA Football 14 is an American football video game published by EA Sports and developed by EA Tiburon. Part of the NCAA Football series, it is the successor to NCAA Football 13. Despite the game's positive critical and commercial reception, no sequel was produced the following year. Due to legal issues surrounding the game's use of college player likenesses, NCAA Football 14 was the last installment of the NCAA Football series until EA Sports College Football 25. The game remained popular for over a decade after its release. Unofficial roster updates were released reflecting subsequent seasons. Fans also created the unofficial College Football Revamped mod, updating the graphics, uniforms, and presentation to match modern times. On March 13, 2025, the online servers for the game were shut down.

== Development ==
NCAA Football 14 is part of Electronic Arts's NCAA Football video game series. Part of the game's development focused on improving its user interface and presentation, with a mantra to "keep things fast" and "keep things moving". The changes included a streamlined main menu (replacing a graphically intensive menu design modeled upon the ESPN College Football graphics package), a shorter pre-game segment, more varied in-game vignettes, and a new halftime show with ESPN's Rece Davis and David Pollack. The game featured Kirk Herbstreit and Brad Nessler as commentators.

On March 10, 2013, it was announced that former Michigan quarterback Denard Robinson would be the cover athlete for the game. A fan vote beginning on December 5, 2012, allowed fans to choose what teams would be represented on the cover. After it was narrowed down to 32, a second round of voting narrowed it down to 16. A third round reduced it to 8 teams with players. Players also vying for the cover were Eddie Lacy, Kenjon Barner, Jarvis Jones, EJ Manuel, Ryan Swope, Andre Ware, John Simon, and Tyler Eifert.

== Reception ==
NCAA Football 14 has an aggregate score for both the Xbox 360 and PS3 versions on Metacritic of 77. The aggregate score on Gamerankings for the PS3 version is 77.27%, and for Xbox 360 it is 78.42%.

Reception

Review scores
Publication	Score
GameSpot	6/10
IGN	7.4/10

The game received mixed to positive reviews. GameSpot gave the game a 6/10, praising the on-field action but criticizing the unnecessary experience system, the recruiting process, and the lack of significant changes from NCAA Football 13. IGN, who gave the game a 7.4/10, had similar comments, praising the fun running game and improvements to Dynasty Mode, but criticizing online servers, the dated visuals, and the "generic" feel to the game.

NCAA Football 14 was a commercial success, selling over 1 million copies.

Due to the 11-year gap between this game and EA Sports College Football 25, the game remained popular throughout the years, with various mods and unofficial roster updates. Fans remained hopeful a new college football game would be produced, but not until real-life NCAA regulations over key issues were changed (name, image, and likeness being paramount) would another college football game be feasible.

== New features ==
On July 5, 2013, the new features for the game were announced.

- Acceleration Burst
- Ball Hawk Pass Defense Assist
- New combo moves
- Force impact ball carrier moves
- Force impact tackling
- Hard Cuts
- New hurdle interactions
- Revamped option types
- Nike Skills Trainer
- New run blocking AI
- New stamina system
- Stumble recovery
- New camera angles
- Ultimate Team
- Power Recruiting
- Neutral site games
- Coach Skills
- Coach Contracts
- 2013 Season Mode
- New Commentary, Pregame and Halftime Show
- Streamlined Menus
- New chants, fight songs, and Iowa wave

== New teams ==
Three new NCAA Football Bowl Subdivision (FBS) teams were added to NCAA Football 14: Georgia State, Old Dominion, and South Alabama. South Alabama joined the FBS in 2012 but had been left out of NCAA Football 13. Georgia State and South Alabama joined the Sun Belt while Old Dominion was soon to join Conference USA. This brought the total number of teams in the game up from 123 to 126.

== See also ==
- Madden NFL 25
- EA Sports College Football 25
- NCAA Football 13
