= List of Dallas Cowboys starting quarterbacks =

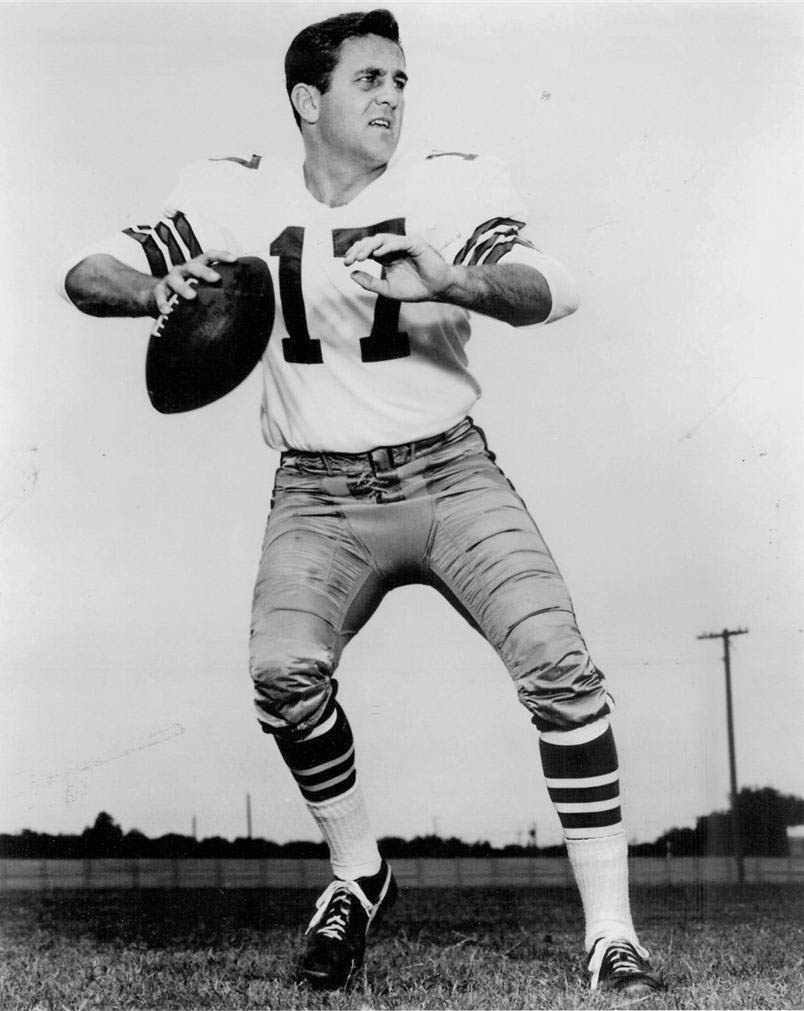
Don Meredith (1960–1968)

These quarterbacks have started at least one game for the Dallas Cowboys of the National Football League (NFL).

== Starting quarterbacks ==
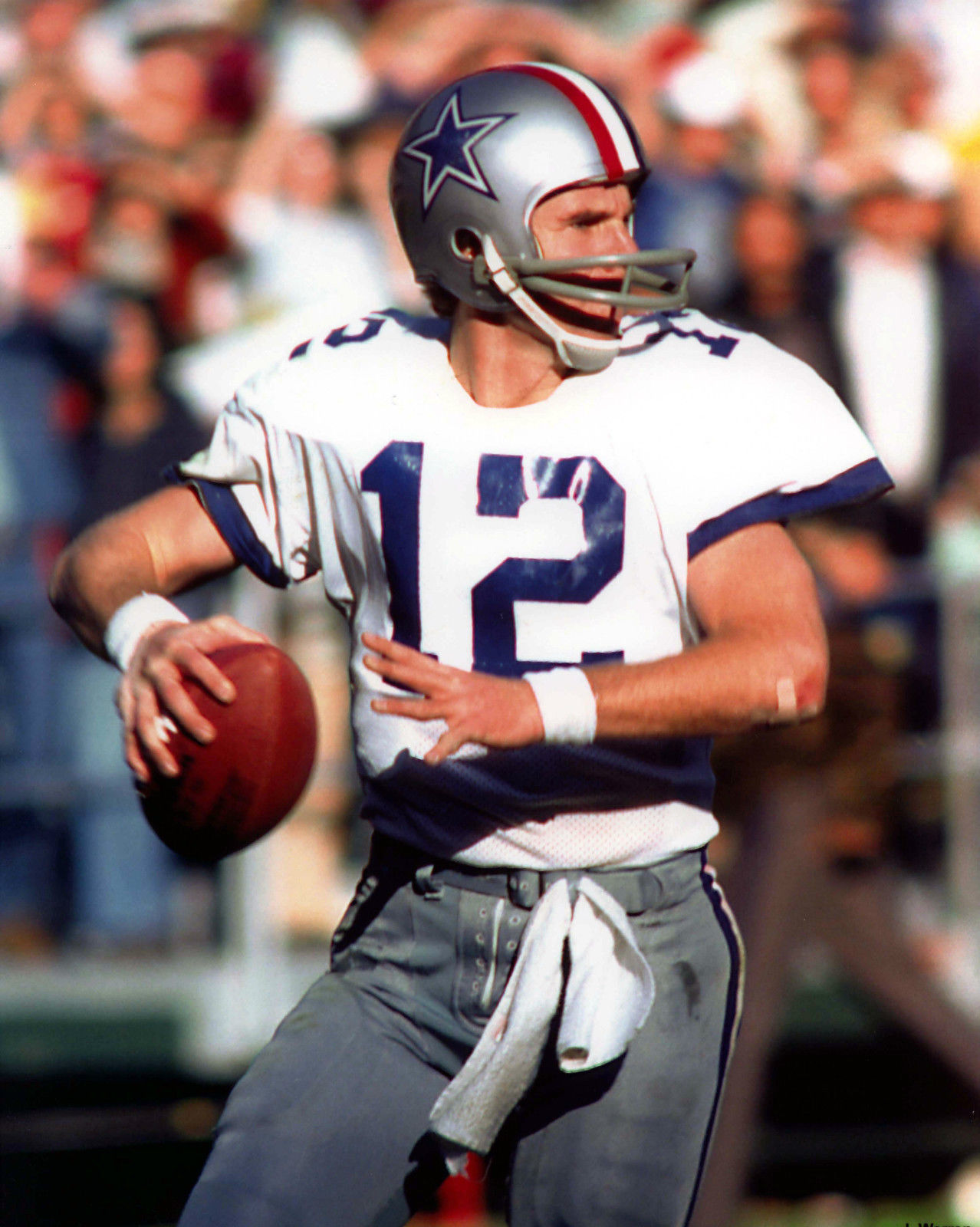
Roger Staubach (1969–1971, 1973–1979)

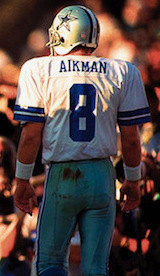
Troy Aikman (1989–2000)

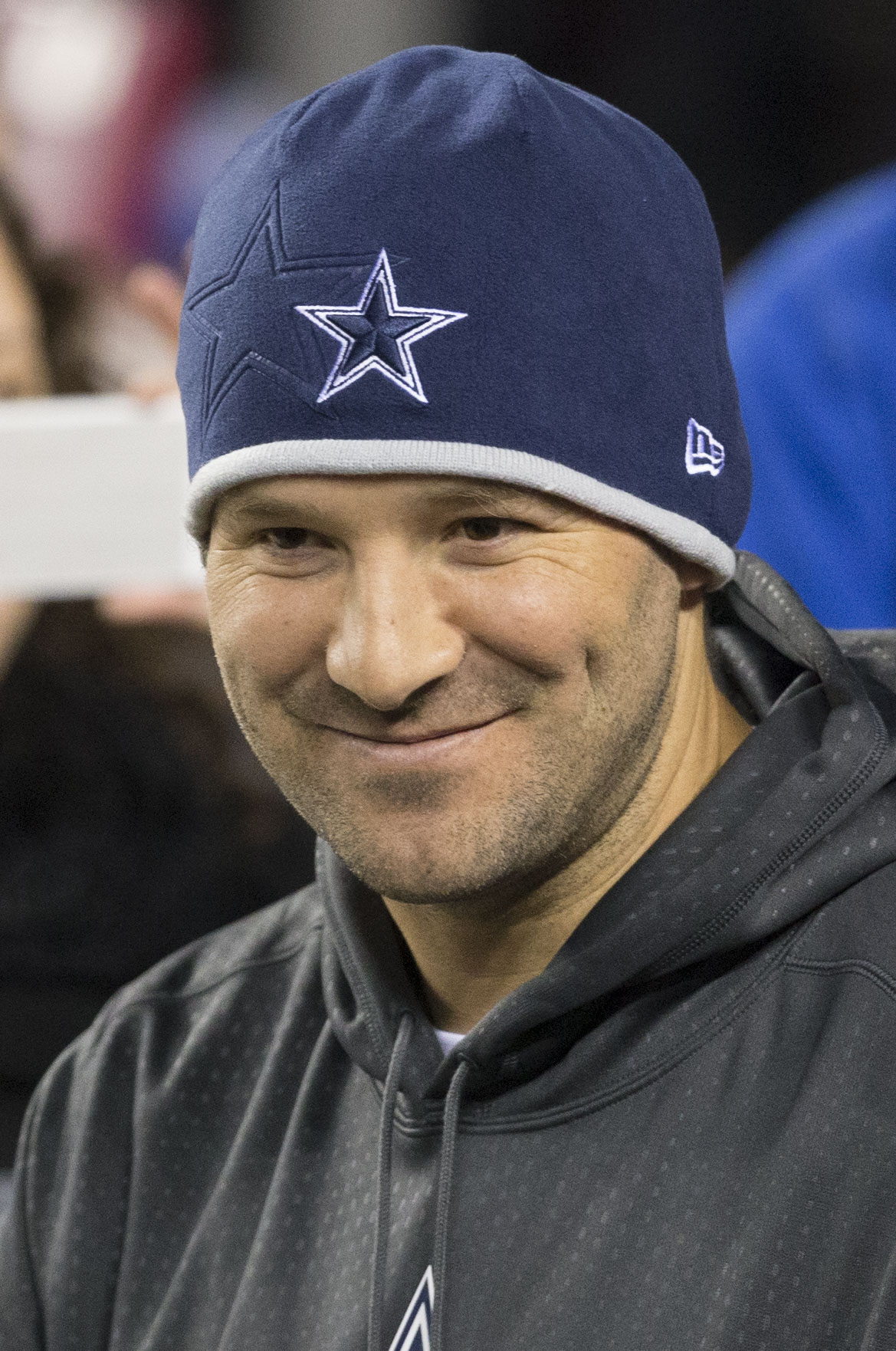
Tony Romo (2006–2015)

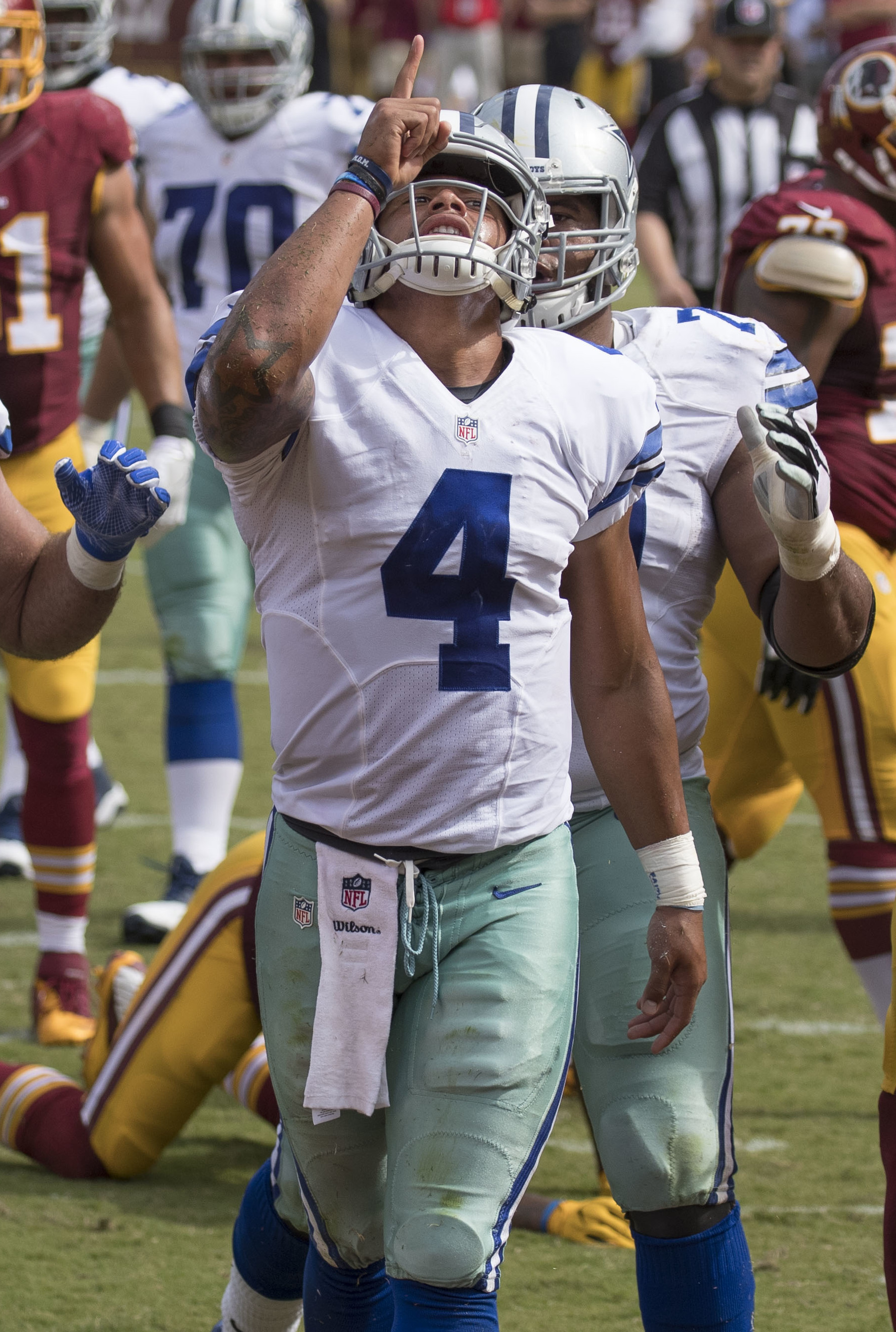
Dak Prescott (2016–present)

Season	Regular season	Postseason	Ref.
1960	Eddie LeBaron (0–9–1) / Don Heinrich (0–1) / Don Meredith (0–1)		
1961	Eddie LeBaron (2–8) / Don Meredith (2–1–1)		
1962	Don Meredith (2–5–1) / Eddie LeBaron (3–3)		
1963	Don Meredith (4–8) / Eddie LeBaron (0–2)		
1964	Don Meredith (5–4–1) / John Roach (0–4)		
1965	Don Meredith (7–4) / Craig Morton (0–2) / Jerry Rhome (0–1)		
1966	Don Meredith (9–3–1) / Jerry Rhome (1–0)	Don Meredith (0–1)	
1967	Don Meredith (7–4) / Craig Morton (2–1)	Don Meredith (1–1)	
1968	Don Meredith (11–2) / Craig Morton (1–0)	Don Meredith (0–1)	
1969	Craig Morton (10–2–1) / Roger Staubach (1–0)	Craig Morton (0–1)	
1970	Craig Morton (8–3) / Roger Staubach (2–1)	Craig Morton (2–1)	
1971	Roger Staubach (10–0) / Craig Morton (1–3)	Roger Staubach (3–0)	
1972	Craig Morton (10–4)	Craig Morton (1–0) / Roger Staubach (0–1)	
1973	Roger Staubach (10–4)	Roger Staubach (1–1)	
1974	Roger Staubach (8–6)		
1975	Roger Staubach (9–4) / Clint Longley (1–0)	Roger Staubach (2–1)	
1976	Roger Staubach (11–3)	Roger Staubach (0–1)	
1977	Roger Staubach (12–2)	Roger Staubach (3–0)	
1978	Roger Staubach (11–4) / Danny White (1–0)	Roger Staubach (2–1)	
1979	Roger Staubach (11–5)	Roger Staubach (0–1)	
1980	Danny White (12–4)	Danny White (2–1)	
1981	Danny White (11–4) / Glenn Carano (1–0)	Danny White (1–1)	
1982	Danny White (6–3)	Danny White (2–1)	
1983	Danny White (12–4)	Danny White (0–1)	
1984	Gary Hogeboom (6–4) / Danny White (3–3)		
1985	Danny White (10–4) / Gary Hogeboom (0–2)	Danny White (0–1)	
1986	Steve Pelluer (3–6) / Danny White (4–2) / Reggie Collier (0–1)		
1987	Danny White (3–6) / Steve Pelluer (2–2) / Kevin Sweeney (2–0)		
1988	Steve Pelluer (3–11) / Kevin Sweeney (0–2)		
1989	Troy Aikman (0–11) / Steve Walsh (1–4)		
1990	Troy Aikman (7–8) / Babe Laufenberg (0–1)		
1991	Troy Aikman (7–5) / Steve Beuerlein (4–0)	Steve Beuerlein (1–1)	
1992	Troy Aikman (13–3)	Troy Aikman (3–0)	
1993	Troy Aikman (11–3) / Jason Garrett (1–0) / Bernie Kosar (0–1)	Troy Aikman (3–0)	
1994	Troy Aikman (10–4) / Jason Garrett (1–0) / Rodney Peete (1–0)	Troy Aikman (1–1)	
1995	Troy Aikman (12–4)	Troy Aikman (3–0)	
1996	Troy Aikman (10–5) / Wade Wilson (0–1)	Troy Aikman (1–1)	
1997	Troy Aikman (6–10)		
1998	Troy Aikman (7–4) / Jason Garrett (3–2)	Troy Aikman (0–1)	
1999	Troy Aikman (7–7) / Jason Garrett (1–1)	Troy Aikman (0–1)	
2000	Troy Aikman (4–7) / Randall Cunningham (1–2) / Anthony Wright (0–2)		
2001	Quincy Carter (3–5) / Anthony Wright (1–2) / Ryan Leaf (0–3) / Clint Stoerner (1–1)		
2002	Chad Hutchinson (2–7) / Quincy Carter (3–4)		
2003	Quincy Carter (10–6)	Quincy Carter (0–1)	
2004	Vinny Testaverde (5–10) / Drew Henson (1–0)		
2005	Drew Bledsoe (9–7)		
2006	Tony Romo (6–4) / Drew Bledsoe (3–3)	Tony Romo (0–1)	
2007	Tony Romo (13–3)	Tony Romo (0–1)	
2008	Tony Romo (8–5) / Brad Johnson (1–2)		
2009	Tony Romo (11–5)	Tony Romo (1–1)	
2010	Jon Kitna (4–5) / Tony Romo (1–5) / Stephen McGee (1–0)		
2011	Tony Romo (8–8)		
2012	Tony Romo (8–8)		
2013	Tony Romo (8–7) / Kyle Orton (0–1)		
2014	Tony Romo (12–3) / Brandon Weeden (0–1)	Tony Romo (1–1)	
2015	Matt Cassel (1–6) / Tony Romo (3–1) / Brandon Weeden (0–3) / Kellen Moore (0–2)		
2016	Dak Prescott (13–3)	Dak Prescott (0–1)	
2017	Dak Prescott (9–7)		
2018	Dak Prescott (10–6)	Dak Prescott (1–1)	
2019	Dak Prescott (8–8)		
2020	Andy Dalton (4–5) / Dak Prescott (2–3) / Garrett Gilbert (0–1) / Ben DiNucci (0–1)		
2021	Dak Prescott (11–5) / Cooper Rush (1–0)	Dak Prescott (0–1)	
2022	Dak Prescott (8–4) / Cooper Rush (4–1)	Dak Prescott (1–1)	
2023	Dak Prescott (12–5)	Dak Prescott (0–1)	
2024	Dak Prescott (3–5) / Cooper Rush (4–4) / Trey Lance (0–1)		
2025	Dak Prescott (7–9–1)		
2026	Dak Prescott (1–1)		

== Most games as starting quarterback ==
These quarterbacks have the most starts for the Cowboys in regular season games (through the 2026 NFL season).

Name	
GP	Games played
GS	Games started
W	Number of wins as starting quarterback
L	Number of losses as starting quarterback
T	Number of ties as starting quarterback
Pct	Winning percentage as starting quarterback

Name	Period	GP	GS	W	L	T	%
Troy Aikman	1989–2000	165	165	94	71	—	.570
Dak Prescott	2016–present	141	141	84	56	1	.599
Tony Romo	2006–2015	156	127	78	49	—	.614
Roger Staubach	1969–1979	131	114	85	29	—	.746
Danny White	1976–1988	166	92	62	30	—	.674
Don Meredith	1960–1968	104	85	48	33	4	.588
Craig Morton	1965–1974	101	47	32	14	1	.691
Quincy Carter	2001–2003	31	31	16	15	—	.516

== Team career passing records ==
(Through the 2026 NFL season)

Name	Comp	Att	%	Yds	TD	Int
Dak Prescott	3,232	4,824	67.0	36,443	249	93
Troy Aikman	2,898	4,715	61.4	32,942	165	141
Tony Romo	2,829	4,335	65.3	34,183	248	117
Danny White	1,761	2,950	59.7	21,959	155	132
Roger Staubach	1,685	2,958	57.0	22,700	153	109
Don Meredith	1,170	2,308	50.7	17,199	135	111
Craig Morton	685	1,308	52.4	10,279	80	73
