= HBCU band =

Marching band of a historically black college or university (HBCU)

A Historically Black College and University marching band (also known as a HBCU band) is the marching band sponsored by a historically black college or university. A distinctive "HBCU-style" of marching band originated in the American South in the 1940s through the blending of earlier traditions of military music and minstrel shows with a performance repertoire based on popular song.

HBCU bands have traditionally played a major role in fostering school pride and camaraderie. Different studies have linked HBCU band membership with both higher and lower rates of academic achievement versus the at-large student population. Among the predominantly male, African-American membership of the ensembles, they have been theorized to support positive identity formation.

== History ==
=== Origins ===
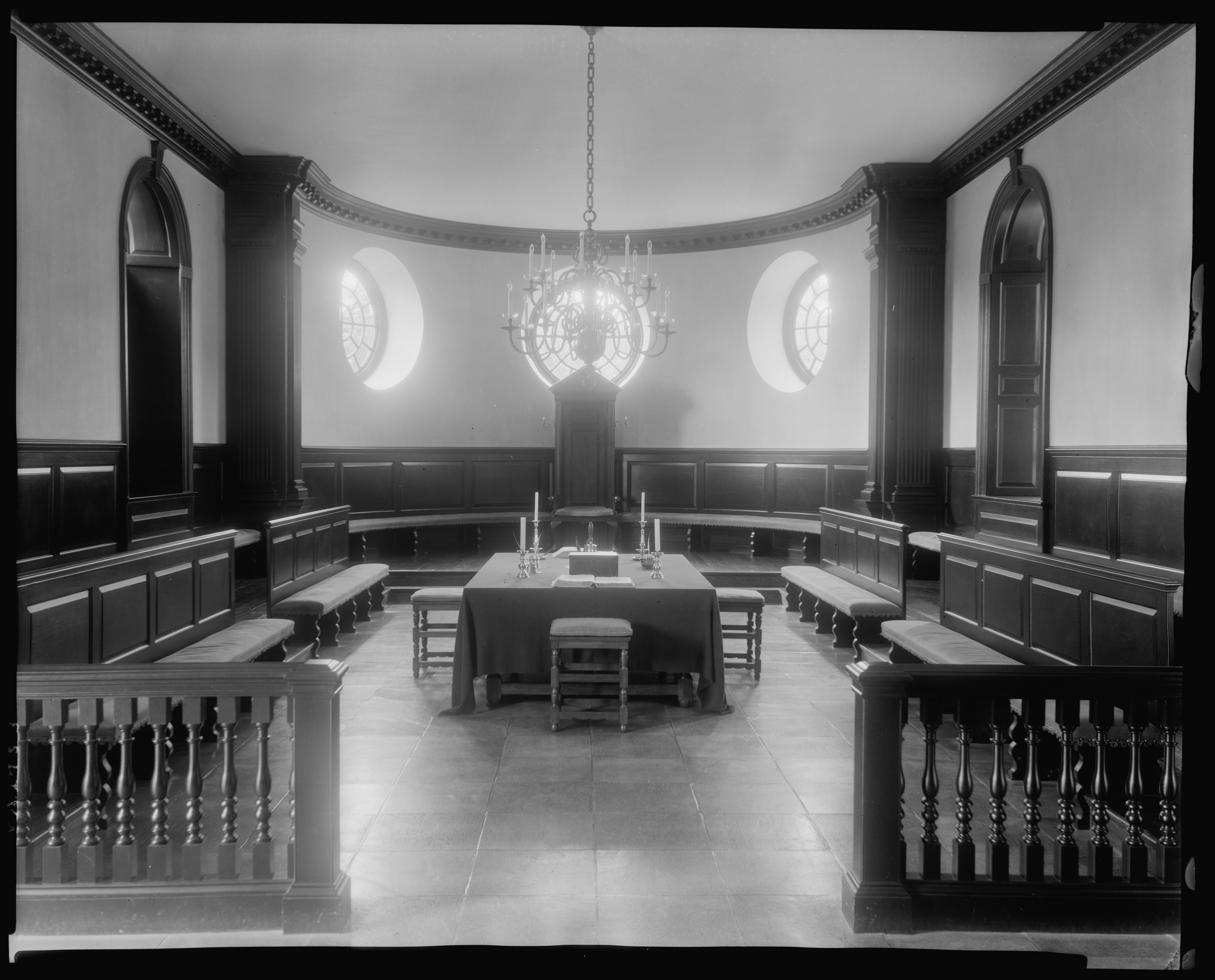
The House of Burgesses' chamber, where a statue was enacted in 1738 to conscript "free mulattos" and blacks. Due to concerns of a rebellion, they were used as musicians instead of frontline troops, establishing the military music tradition from which HBCU bands evolved.

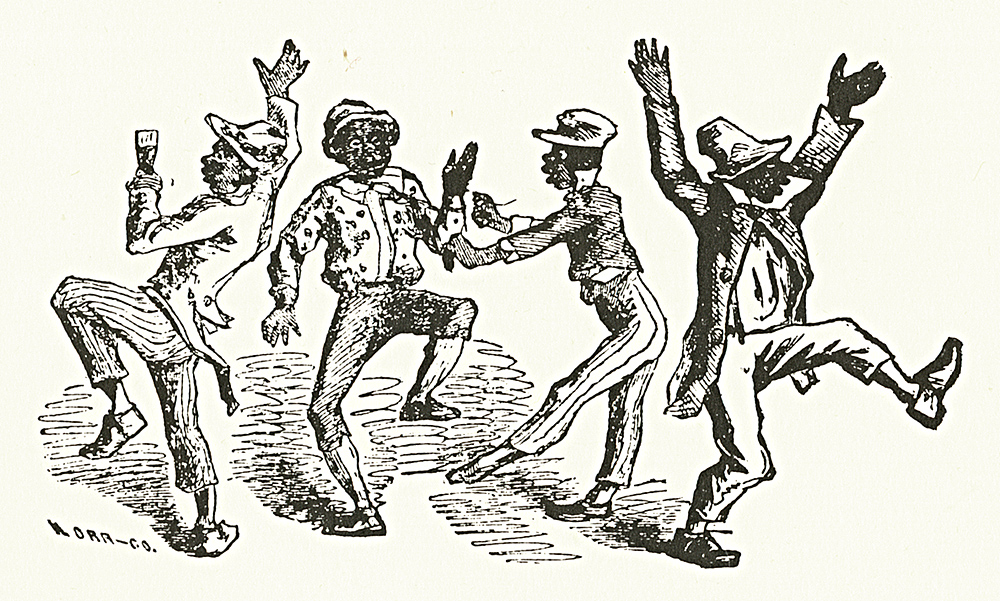
HBCU band style was influenced by the minstrel shows of the 19th century.

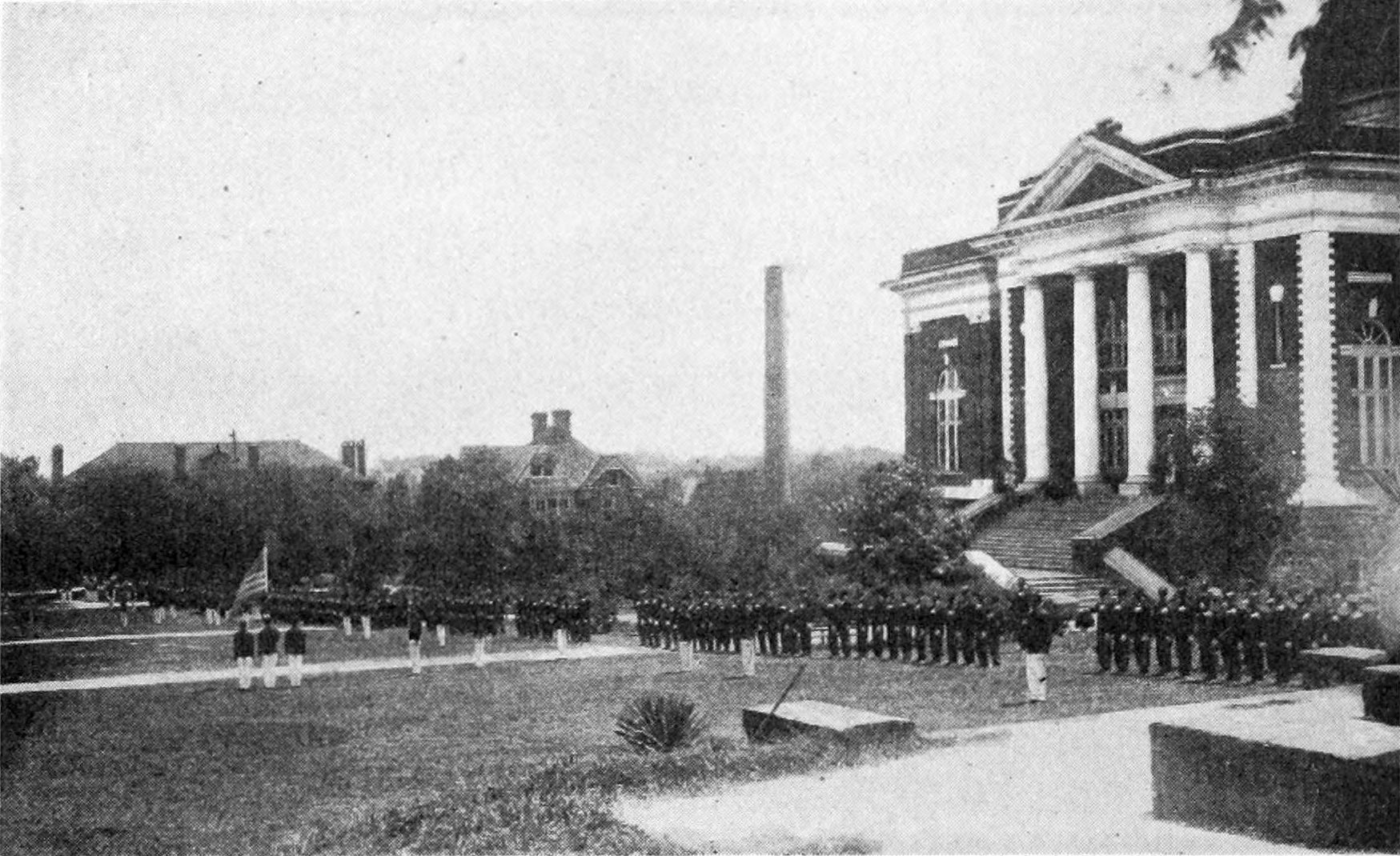
The first band at an HBCU was established at what is now Tuskegee University (pictured in 1918) in 1890.

Early American military music recruited large numbers of black musicians. A 1738 statute enacted by the Virginia House of Burgesses required military service for “free mulattos, blacks, and Native Americans". Due to government concerns of a domestic rebellion, they were prohibited from carrying arms and were, therefore, exclusively used as "drummers, fifers, trumpeters, or pioneers”. As many as 5,000 African-Americans provided military service during the American War of Independence, including notable musicians such as Barzillai Lew. The tendency to recruit African-Americans into military bands continued after independence; following the War of 1812, a large number of civilian, all-black brass bands formed among veteran military musicians across the United States, but particularly in New Orleans where they often adopted the theatrical styles of minstrel shows.

=== Early history ===
Drawing on these traditions, the first HBCU band was established in 1890 at Tuskegee Normal School (later Tuskegee University) under student direction. In 1907 its first professional director, retired U.S. Army Major Nathaniel Clark Smith, was appointed. Ensembles at additional historically black colleges and universities followed. Under the early direction of W.C. Hardy - a former minstrel show musician - Alabama A&M University began performing popular songs of the day in addition to marches, an approach to music selection later popularized among other HBCU and Primarily White Institution (PWI) bands.

The earliest incarnation of the modern HBCU style of marching band, in which the distinctive high-stepping style coalesced with popular music and elaborate dance routines by both bandsmen and auxiliaries, has been traced to Florida A&M University in the 1940s. Beginning in 1952, under director Conrad Hutchinson, the Grambling State University band cultivated a reputation for extravagant performances that was soon emulated by bands at most other HBCUs.

In 1955, the marching band of Tennessee State University became the first HBCU band to appear on national television during their performance at a Chicago Bears NFL game. Six years later, in 1961, the band became the first HBCU band to perform for an inauguration of the President of the United States when it was assigned to the inaugural parade of John F. Kennedy. The Grambling State University marching band provided halftime entertainment at Super Bowl I in 1967, with its performance later named "One of the Top 10 Super Bowl Halftime Shows” by Sports Illustrated.

=== 21st century ===
As of the 2010s, many HBCUs have marching bands. Some of these HBCU bands include Alabama State University, Savannah State University, Grambling State University, Tennessee State University, Norfolk State University, Texas Southern University, South Carolina State University, North Carolina A&T State University, Jackson State University, Florida A&M University, Bethune Cookman University, Winston-Salem State University, Fayetteville State University, Shaw University, Virginia State University, Albany State University, Southern University, Howard University, Morehouse College, and Hampton University. Some high schools, principally in the American South, have adopted the HBCU style, including Jefferson Davis High School of Montgomery, Alabama, Jefferson County High School (Georgia) in Louisville, Georgia and Southwest DeKalb High School in Decatur, Georgia.

== Characteristics ==
=== Drum majors ===
Drum majors and dancers of Jefferson Davis High School, an HBCU-style high school band, shown during the Rex parade in 2020.

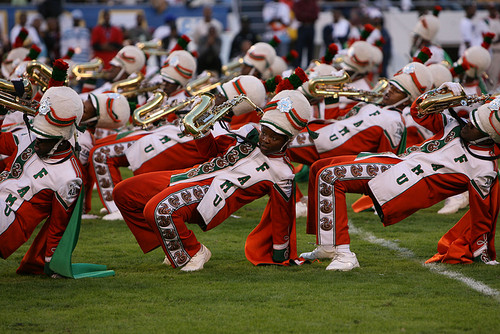
Members of the Florida A&M University marching band perform during a "breakdown" in 2008.

The Winston-Salem State University band in 2019, exhibiting the high step with upper body swing typical of HBCU band marching style.

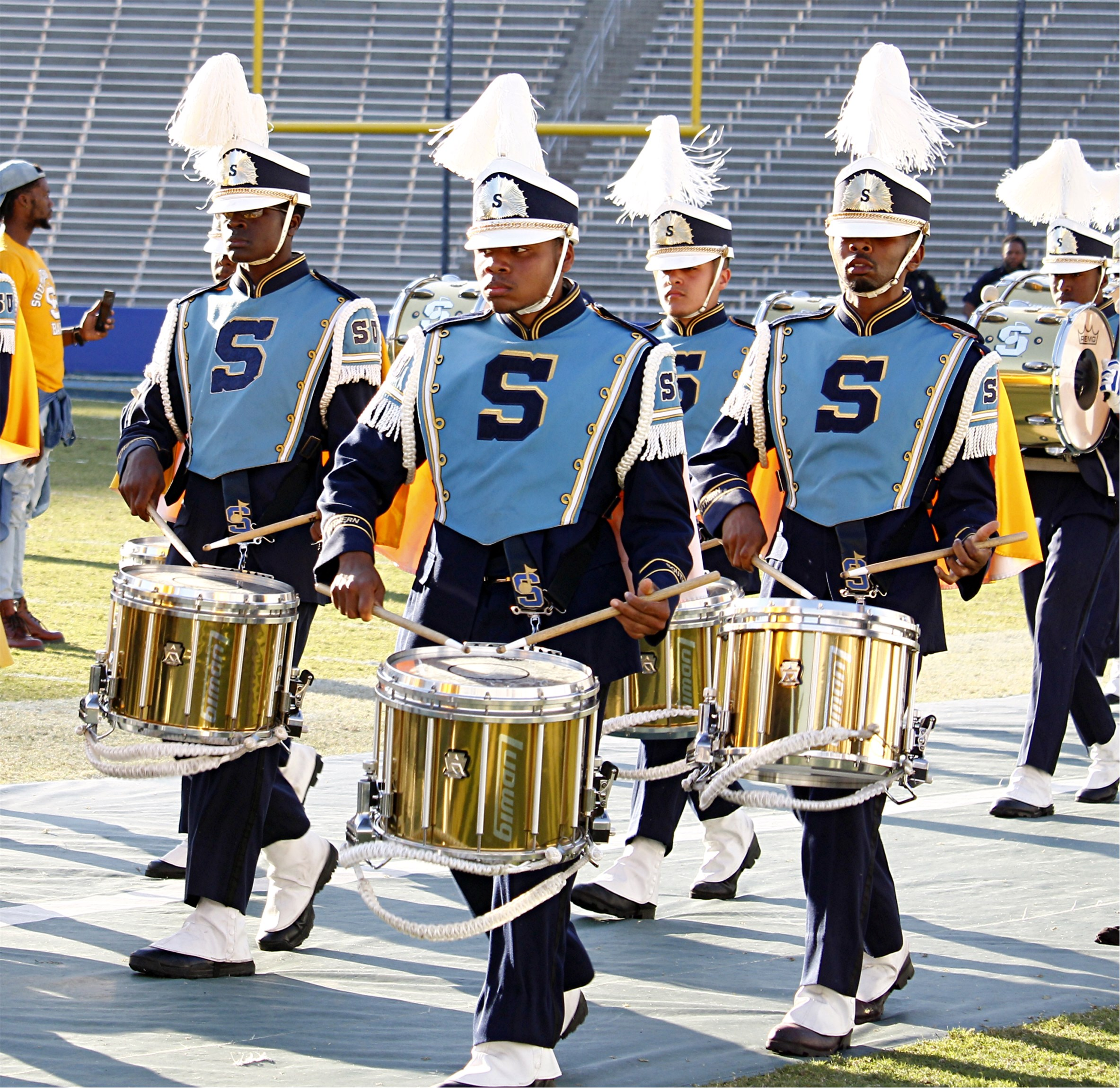
Snare drummers of the Southern University marching band pictured in 2019.

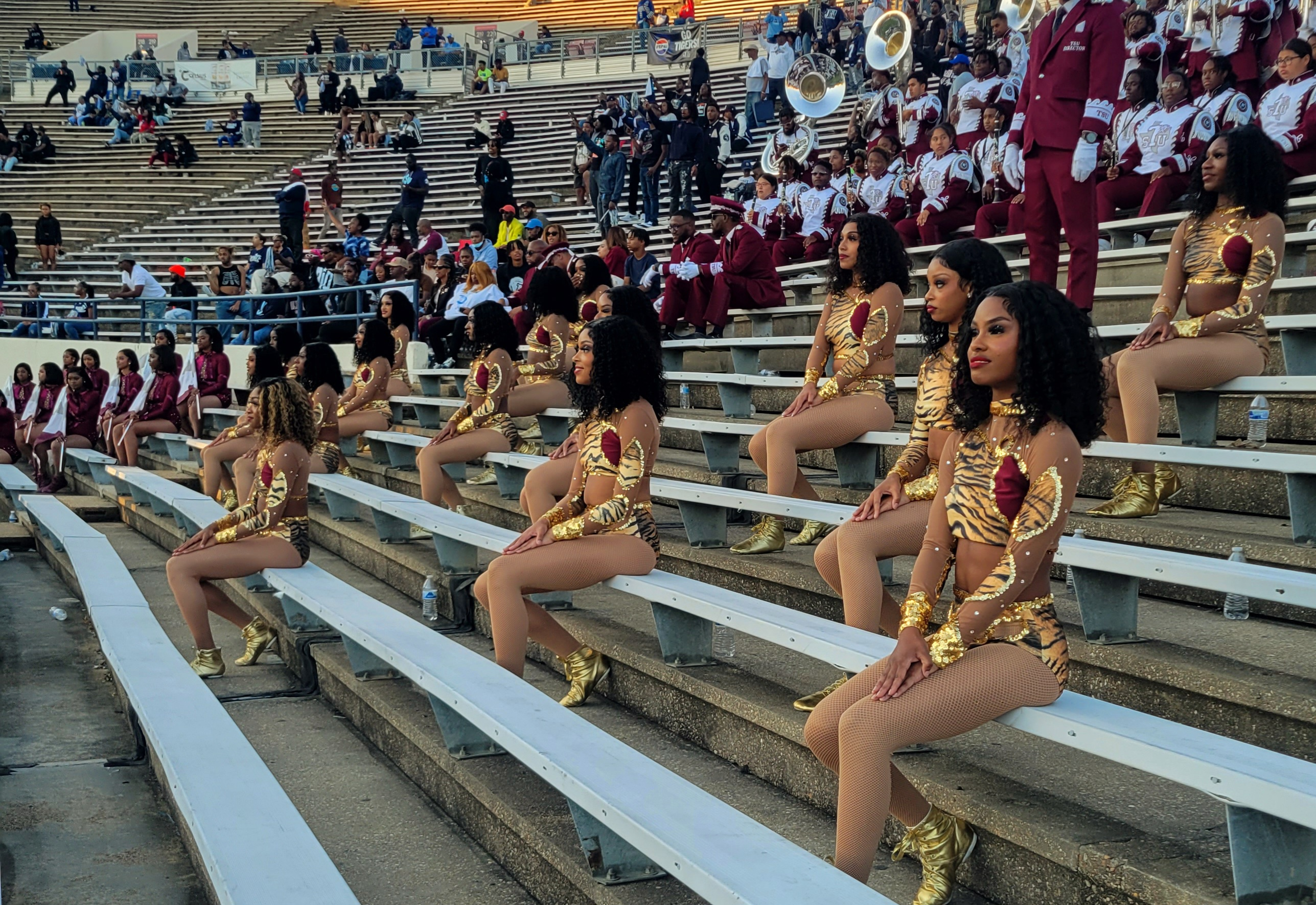
Texas Southern University's band in 2023

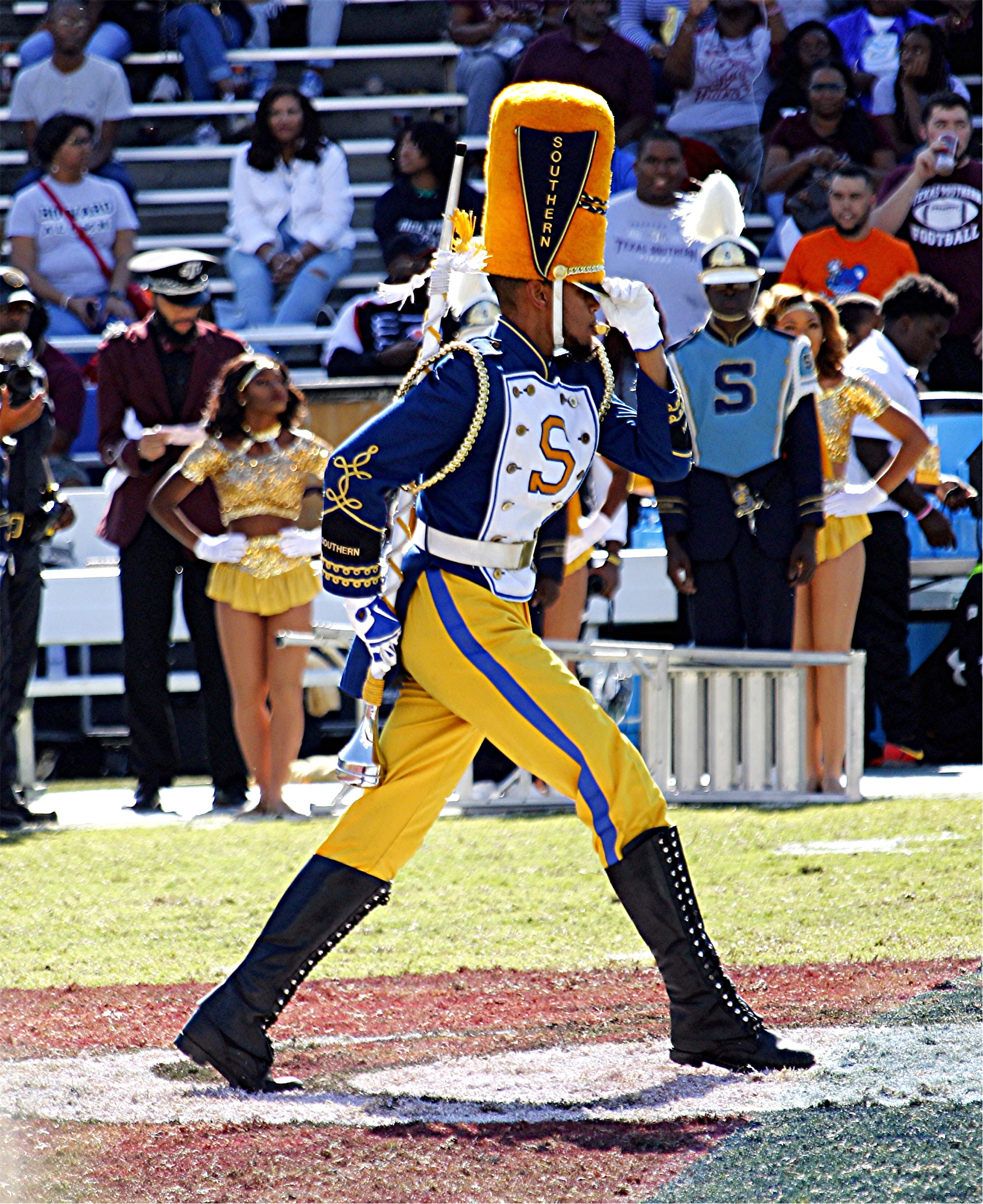
The drum major of Southern University pictured in 2019.

Drum majors in HBCU bands fill a different role than those of other marching bands which use the position to control tempo and impart field direction. The role of HBCU drum majors evolved from that of leaders of bands in black minstrel parades who were performers themselves. In the black minstrel theatrics of the 19th century, according to Lee Evans citing DeVeaux and Giddins, "'black people realized that they could perform their ‘blackness’ for money,' so they began dancing and singing and doing comedy skits in the streets'. (Note: Depending on the source, this either mimicked blackface Minstrelsy, or blackface Minstrelsy mimicked it.)

=== Instrumentation ===
Many HBCU bands feature an instrumentation that privileges brass instruments to maximize sound and create a "brighter" musical tone. Snare drummers typically use a traditional, military-style sling drum instead of the harness drum typical of contemporary American marching bands.

=== Marching style and drill technique ===
The marching style of HBCU bands has been described as "show style" and represents a modification of the high-step marching style popularized by the bands of the Big Ten Conference in the early 20th century with the addition of an upper body swing. During field shows, HBCU bands perform geometric maneuvers featuring straight lines based on the four-person squad system of drill influenced by former Purdue University band director Bill Moffit's text Patterns in Motion. These drills are interspersed with energetic dance routines known as breakdowns.

=== Repertoire ===
From an early stage, HBCU bands have placed a focus on performing a musical repertoire reflective of the popular song of the day, a practice later adopted by PWI bands. This has recently included a heavy emphasis on R&B and Hip Hop chart toppers. HBCU bands are also known for "punches" – short, musical pieces drawn from the melody of songs associated with popular culture such as television and movie theme songs. During stoppages in game play these will be performed in alternating sequences with the opposing band, with the ensemble able to perform the most without repeating any "winning" the battle.

=== Terminology ===
HBCU bands employ a distinct nomenclature. Performances are called battles, while the energetic participation or approval of the crowd is known as house and ensembles attempt to "win house". Performing a "punch" is called throwing, as in "throwing a punch".

== Events ==
The Honda Battle of the Bands is a popular annual, invitational exhibition of HBCU bands that occurs each winter.

Since its inception in 2019, the National Battle of the Bands in Houston, Texas has been one of the most attended annual HBCU marching band showcases in the nation. Over 40,000 are in attendance each year to see 6-8 HBCU marching bands perform in NRG Stadium every August.

== Sociological and pedagogical aspects of HBCU bands ==
=== Academics and personal development ===
==== Negative aspects ====
Graduation rates among members of HBCU marching bands tend to lag behind those of the general population of the institutions.

==== Positive aspects ====
Research by Henry Taylor Frierson concluded that HBCU marching bands represent an ideal institution for development of black male youth by supporting positive identity formation and a customized support structure.

=== Cultural status ===
A 2009 study found that 50.2-percent of incoming, current, and former students and faculty at HBCUs listed the reputation of the school's marching band as a leading factor in their decision to attend or work at that institution, making it the fourth most cited factor after genuine interest, cultural connection, and location. Meanwhile, 83.9-percent stated their feeling that most people attended HBCU football games only to see the marching band perform. In 2018, the Associated Press observed that "on some black college campuses, marching band members are more popular than basketball or football players".

=== Gender roles ===
The position of drum major at HBCUs has traditionally been dominated by men. In 2018, the first female drum major at Florida A&M University was selected in that band's 72-year history.

=== Hazing ===
Several sources have reported on endemic hazing within HBCU bands. In 2011, NPR reported that – at one school – new members "had to face choreographed assaults, with two-by-fours, belts, baseball bats ... suffering literally hundreds of blows from their older compatriots". Hazing-related deaths and injuries within the bands of Southern University and Florida A&M University have led to criminal prosecutions.

A limited survey conducted in 2013 by Bruce Allen Carter of the National Council on the Arts found that gay males who were members of an HBCU band experienced "ever-present anxiety" when participating in band-related activities. Each survey participant also reported being subject to hazing that was so "shameful and embarrassing" that it was "not something they ever discussed".

The Red Dawg Order, a student anti-hazing organization established in 1994 within the Florida A&M University marching band, subsequently morphed into a "ganglike organization" that established a presence in nearly every HBCU band in the United States and became – in some bands – a leading instigator of hazing.

=== Racial issues ===
HBCU bands tend to be predominantly African-American, though occasionally persons of other races have been members. According to a 2012 study, white students attending an HBCU generally avoided social activities and focused on academics, however, if they were a member of the school's band they "appeared to develop strong relationships with their peers" within the ensemble.

In 2001, Matt Smith became the first white drum major at Hampton University. According to Smith, some opposing schools would use Smith's race to demean the group as a whole.

From 2018 to 2020, Justin Heideman, who is white, was head drum major of the Jefferson Davis High School (Montgomery, Alabama) marching band, an HBCU-style high school band. In the second year of Heideman's tenure, after video of one of the band's performances was posted online, Heideman encountered – according to USA Today – "hate, ignorance and prejudice" in a minority of online comments to the video, with some suggesting "there was something heinous about a group of black children following the lead of a white boy". However, Jefferson Davis students defended Heideman's role and the majority of comments offered "praise and positive social engagement". Writing in Teen Vogue, Danielle Kwateng-Clark later lauded Heideman as a positive example of "a white person ... existing in predominantly Black space".

== In popular culture ==
- The 2002 comedy film Drumline chronicled the story of students in a HBCU band. A television sequel, Drumline: A New Beat premiered on VH1 in 2014.
- In 2017 ESPN launched ESPN/The Undefeated HBCU Band Rankings "to identify the top bands from the Mid-Eastern Athletic Conference (MEAC) and Southwestern Athletic Conference (SWAC)".

== See also ==
- Jazz funeral
- Stepping
