= History of AT&T =

Telecommunications history

The history of AT&T originates in the invention of the telephone. The Bell Telephone Company was established in 1877 by Alexander Graham Bell, who was granted the first U.S. patent for what became the telephone, and his father-in-law, Gardiner Greene Hubbard. Bell and Hubbard also established American Telephone and Telegraph Company in 1885, which acquired the Bell Telephone Company, and became the primary telephone company in the United States. This company maintained an effective monopoly on telephone service in the United States until anti-trust regulators agreed to allow AT&T to retain Western Electric and enter general trades computer manufacture and sales in return for its offer to split the Bell System by divesting itself of ownership of the Bell Operating Companies in 1982.

AT&T Corporation was eventually purchased by one of the Regional Bell Operating Companies, the former Southwestern Bell Company, in 2005, and the combined company became known as AT&T Inc.

== Origins ==
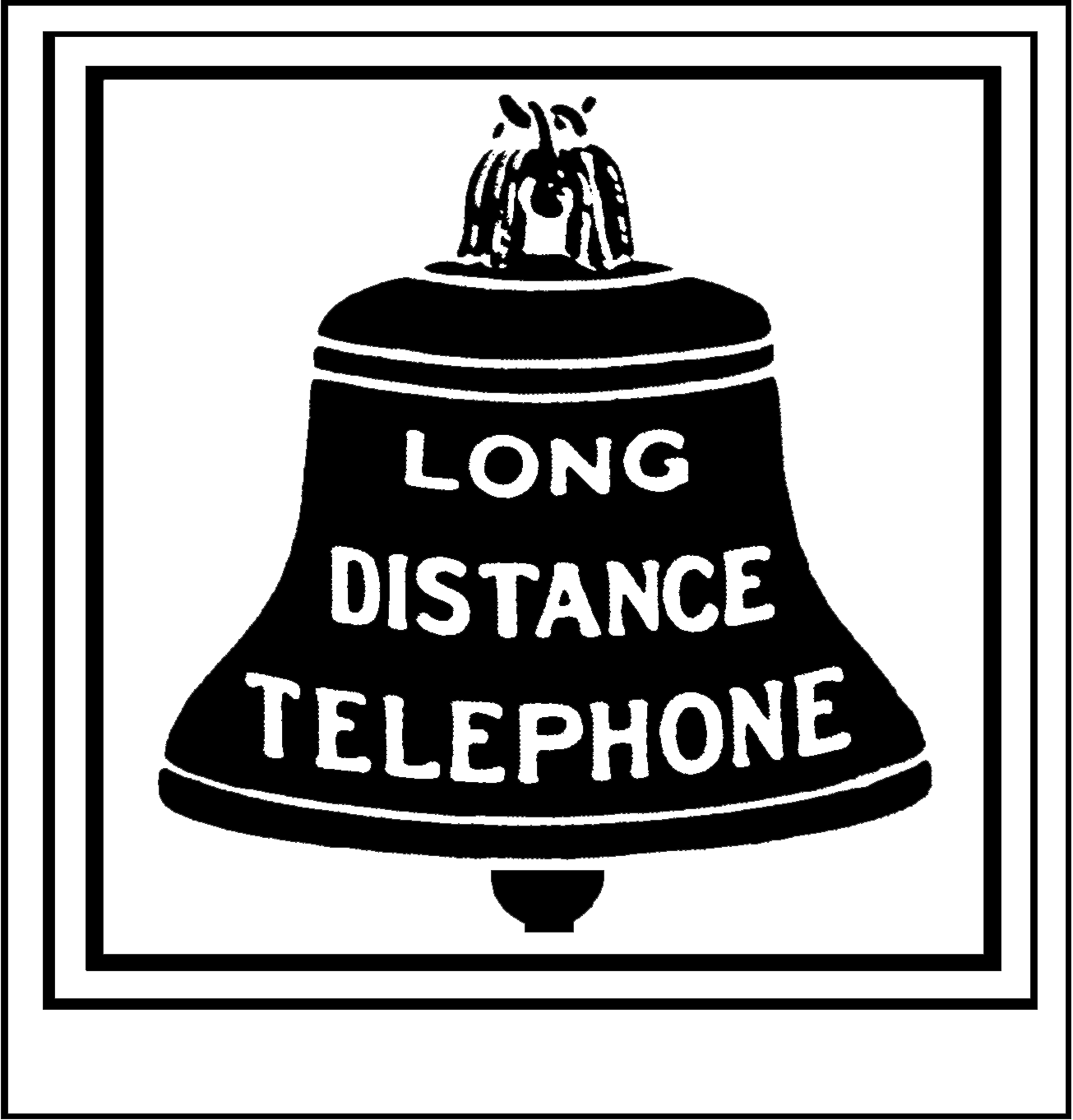
A Bell System logo (called the Blue Bell) used from 1889 to 1900

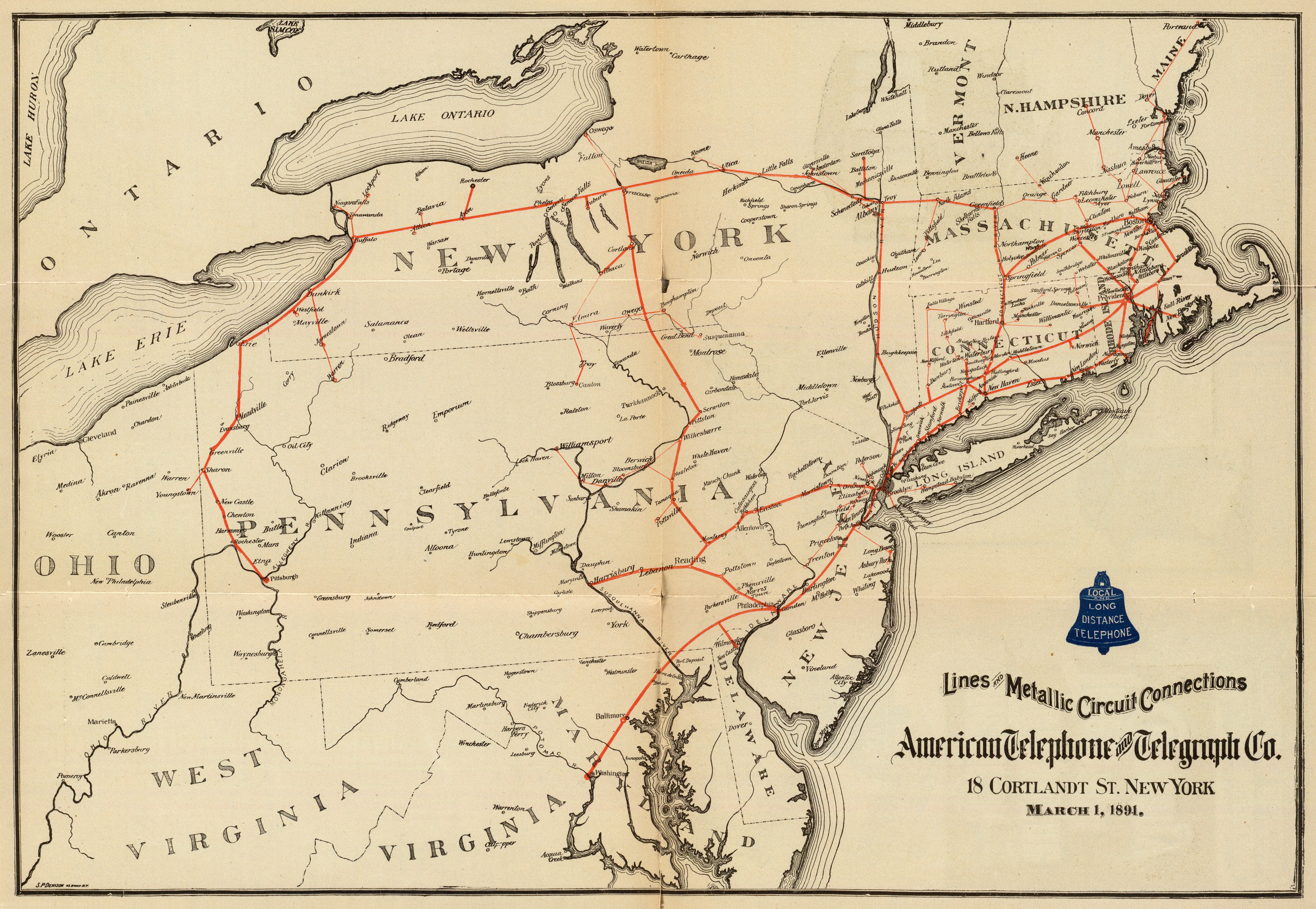
AT&T's lines and metallic circuit connections. March 1, 1891.

The formation of the Bell Telephone Company superseded an agreement between Alexander Graham Bell and his financiers, principal among them Gardiner Greene Hubbard and Thomas Sanders. Renamed the National Bell Telephone Company in March 1879, it became the American Bell Telephone Company in March 1880. By 1881, it had bought a controlling interest in the Western Electric Company from Western Union. Only three years earlier, Western Union had turned down Gardiner Hubbard's offer to sell it all rights to the telephone for $100,000 ($3.34 million in 2009 dollars).

In 1880, the management of American Bell created what would become AT&T Long Lines. The project was the first of its kind to create a nationwide long-distance network with a commercially viable cost-structure. This project was formally incorporated into a separate company named American Telephone and Telegraph Company on March 3, 1885. Starting from New York, the network reached Chicago in 1892.

Bell's patent on the telephone expired in 1893, but the company's much larger customer base made its service much more valuable than alternatives and substantial growth continued.

On December 30, 1899, the American Telephone and Telegraph Company bought the assets of American Bell; this was because Massachusetts corporate laws (which limited market capitalization to ten million dollars, preventing the direct growth of American Bell itself) were more restrictive than those of New York, where AT&T was headquartered. With this transfer of assets, AT&T became the parent of the Bell System.

By 1902, there were 1,317,000 telephones under AT&T.

National long-distance service reached San Francisco with the First transcontinental telephone call in 1915. This connection used a system of lines with loading coils and the Audion vacuum tube repeater first tested between New York and Philadelphia in 1913. Transatlantic services started in 1927 using two-way radio, but the first trans-Atlantic telephone cable did not arrive until Sept. 25, 1956, with TAT-1.

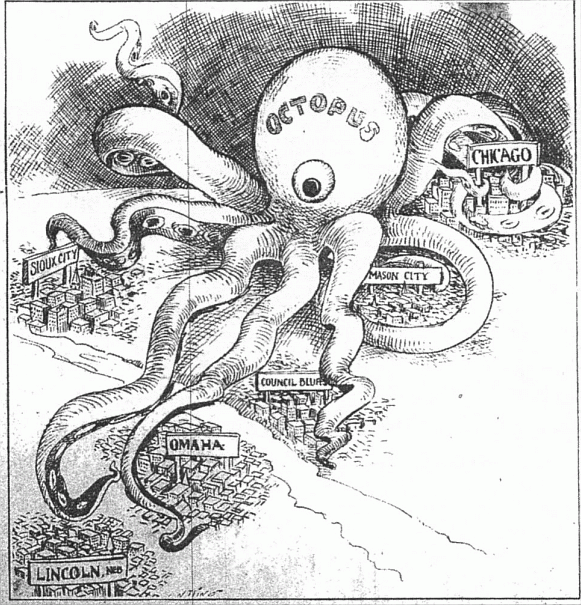
AT&T as grasping octopus taking control of entire cities out West. from Telephony (April 1907) p. 235

== Monopoly ==
As a result of a combination of regulatory actions by government and actions by AT&T, the firm eventually gained what most regard as monopoly status. In 1907, AT&T president Theodore Vail made it known that he was pursuing a goal of "One Policy, One System, Universal Service." AT&T began purchasing competitors, which attracted the attention of antitrust regulators. To avoid antitrust action, in a deal with the government, Vail agreed to the Kingsbury Commitment of 1913. One of the three terms of the agreement forbade AT&T from acquiring any more independent phone companies without the approval of the Interstate Commerce Commission.

The Bell System logo and trademark as it appeared in 1972

G.W. Brock says in The Telecommunications Industry: The Dynamics Of Market Structure, "[The] provision allowed Bell and the independents to exchange telephones in order to give each other geographical monopolies. So long as only one company served a given geographical area there was little reason to expect price competition to take place." AT&T focused on purchasing companies within specific geographic areas that increased its effective control of the telephone system market, while selling its less-desirable and previously acquired companies to independent buyers. Also included in the Kingsbury Commitment was the requirement that AT&T allow competitors to connect through its phone lines, which reduced the incentive of these companies to build competing long-distance lines.

In 1913, after vacuum-tube inventor Lee de Forest began to suffer financial difficulties, AT&T bought De Forest's vacuum-tube patents for the bargain price of $50,000 ($1.63 million in 2009 dollars). In particular, AT&T acquired ownership of the 'Audion', the first triode (three-element) vacuum tube, which greatly amplified telephone signals. The patent increased AT&T's control over the manufacture and distribution of long-distance telephone services and allowed the Bell System to build the United States' first coast-to-coast telephone line. Thanks to the pressures of World War I, AT&T and RCA owned all useful patents on vacuum tubes. RCA staked a position in wireless communication; AT&T pursued the use of tubes in telephone amplifiers. Some patent allies and partners in RCA were angered when the two companies' research on tubes began to overlap, and there were many patent disputes.

Around 1917, the idea that everyone in the country should have phone service and that the government should promote that began being discussed in government. AT&T agreed, saying in a 1917 annual report: "A combination of like activities under proper control and regulation, the service to the public would be better, more progressive, efficient, and economical than competitive systems." In 1918 the federal government nationalized the entire telecommunications industry, with national security as the stated intent. Rates were regulated so that customers in large cities would pay higher rates to subsidize those in more remote areas. Vail was appointed to manage the telephone system with AT&T being paid a percentage of the telephone revenues. AT&T profited well from the nationalization arrangement which ended a year later. States then began regulating rates so that those in rural areas would not have to pay high prices, and the competition was highly regulated or prohibited in local markets. Also, potential competitors were forbidden from installing new lines to compete, with state governments wishing to avoid "duplication." The claim was that telephone service was a "natural monopoly," meaning that one firm could better serve the public than two or more. Eventually, AT&T's market share amounted to what most would regard as a monopolistic share.

AT&T, RCA, and their patent allies and partners finally settled their disputes in 1926 by compromise. AT&T decided to focus on the telephone business as a communications common carrier and sold its broadcasting subsidiary Broadcasting Company of America to RCA. The assets included station WEAF, which for some time had broadcast from AT&T headquarters in New York City. In return, RCA signed a service agreement with AT&T, ensuring any radio network RCA started would have transmission connections provided by AT&T. Both companies agreed to cross-license patents, ending that aspect of the dispute. RCA, GE, and Westinghouse were now free to combine their assets to form the National Broadcasting Company, or NBC network.

In 1925, AT&T created a new unit called Bell Telephone Laboratories, commonly known as Bell Labs. This research and development unit proved highly successful, pioneering, among other things, radio astronomy, the transistor, the photovoltaic cell, the Unix operating system, and the C programming language. AT&T ranked 13th among United States corporations in the value of World War II military contracts. In 1949, the Justice Department filed an antitrust suit aimed at forcing the divestiture of Western Electric, which was settled seven years later by AT&T's agreement to confine its products and services to common carrier telecommunications and license its patents to "all interested parties." A key effect of this was to ban AT&T from selling computers despite its key role in electronics research and development. Nonetheless, technological innovation continued. For example, AT&T commissioned the first experimental communications satellite, Telstar I in 1962.

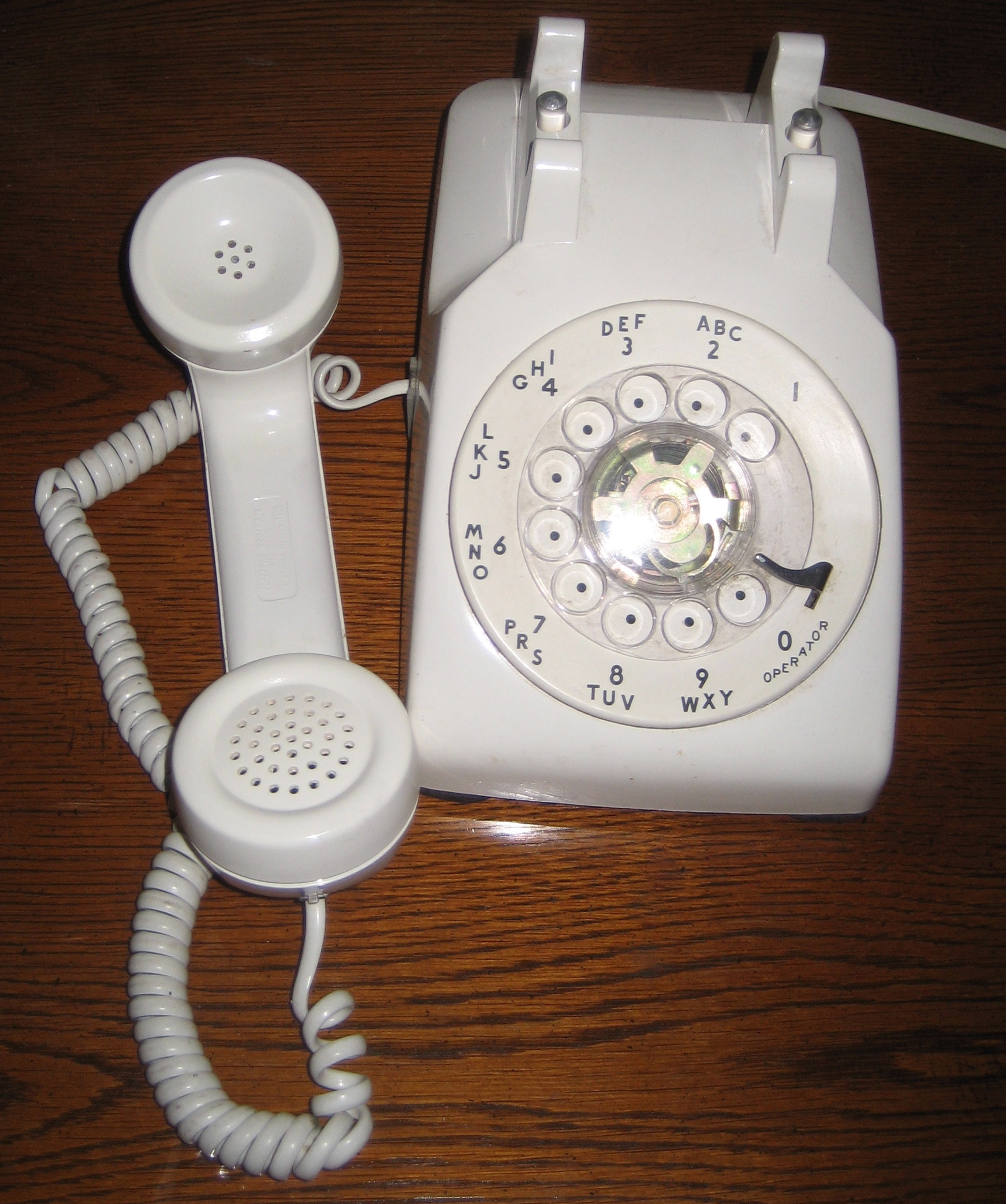
Standard Western Electric 500-type telephone set, rented to U.S. telephone subscribers

Public utility commissions in state and local jurisdictions regulated the Bell System and all the other telephone companies. The Federal Communications Commission (FCC) regulated all services across state lines. These commissions controlled the rates that companies could charge and the specific services and equipment they could offer.

AT&T increased its control of the telephone system through its leasing arrangements for telephones and telephone equipment made by its subsidiary, Western Electric. Like most telephones of the time in the United States, Western Electric-made phones were owned not by individual customers, but by local Bell System telephone companies — all of which were in turn owned by AT&T, which also owned Western Electric itself. Each phone was leased from AT&T on a monthly basis by customers, who generally paid for their phone and its connection many times over in cumulative lease fees. This monopoly made millions of extra dollars for AT&T, which had the secondary effect of greatly limiting phone choices and styles. AT&T strictly enforced policies against buying and using phones by other manufacturers that had not first been transferred to and re-rented from the local Bell monopoly. Many phones made by Western Electric thus carried the following disclaimer permanently molded into their housings: "BELL SYSTEM PROPERTY — NOT FOR SALE." Telephones were also labeled with a sticker marking the Bell Operating Company that owned the telephone.

In 1968, the Federal Communications Commission allowed the Carterfone and other devices to be connected directly to the AT&T network, as long as they did not cause damage to the system. This ruling (13 F.C.C.2d 420) created the possibility of selling devices that could connect to the phone system and opened up the market to numerous products, including answering machines, fax machines, cordless phones, computer modems and the early, dialup Internet.

In the 1980s, after some consumers began buying phones from other manufacturers anyway, AT&T changed its policy by selling customers the phone's housing, retaining ownership of the mechanical components — which still required paying AT&T a monthly leasing fee.

For most of the 20th century, AT&T subsidiary AT&T Long Lines thus enjoyed a near-total monopoly on long-distance telephone service in the United States. AT&T also controlled 22 Bell Operating Companies which provided local telephone service to most of the United States. While there were many "independent telephone companies", General Telephone being the most significant, the Bell System was far larger than all the others, and widely considered a monopoly itself.

=== Erosion of "a natural monopoly" ===
For many years, AT&T had been permitted to retain its monopoly status under the assumption that it was a natural monopoly. The first erosion to this monopoly occurred in 1956 where the Hush-A-Phone v. United States ruling allowed a third-party device to be attached to rented telephones owned by AT&T. This was followed by the 1968 Carterfone decision that allowed third-party equipment to be connected to the AT&T telephone network. The rise of cheap microwave communications equipment in the 1960s and 1970s opened a window of opportunity for competitors — no longer was the acquisition of expensive rights-of-way necessary for the construction of a long-distance telephone network. In light of this, the FCC permitted MCI (Microwave Communications, Inc) to sell communication services to large businesses. This technical-economic argument against the necessity of AT&T's monopoly position would hold for a mere fifteen years until the beginning of the fiber-optics revolution sounded the end of microwave-based long distance.

== Breakup ==
The rest of the telephone monopoly lasted until January 8, 1982, the date of settlement of United States v. AT&T, a 1974 United States Department of Justice antitrust suit against AT&T. Under the settlement, AT&T ("Ma Bell") agreed to divest its local exchange service operating companies, in return for a chance to go into the computer business (see AT&T Computer Systems). AT&T's local operations were split into seven independent Regional Bell operating companies, commonly known as "Baby Bells".

With the American consumer's new ability to purchase phones outright, AT&T and the Bell System lost the considerable revenues earned from phone leasing by local Bell companies. Forced to compete with other manufacturers for new phone sales, the aging Western Electric phone designs still marketed through AT&T failed to sell, and Western Electric eventually closed all of its U.S. phone manufacturing plants. AT&T, reduced in value by about 70%, continued to run all its long-distance services through AT&T Communications (the new name of AT&T Long Lines), although it lost some market share in the ensuing years to competitors MCI and Sprint.

A sign that hung in many Bell facilities in 1983 read:

There are two giant entities at work in our country, and they both have an amazing influence on our daily lives ... one has given us radar, sonar, stereo, teletype, the transistor, hearing aids, artificial larynxes, talking movies, and the telephone. The other has given us the Civil War, the Spanish–American War, the First World War, the Second World War, the Korean War, the Vietnam War, double-digit inflation, double-digit unemployment, the Great Depression, the gasoline crisis, and the Watergate fiasco. Guess which one is now trying to tell the other one how to run its business?

== Post break-up restructuring ==
=== 1991–2004: Spinoffs and change in services ===
Western Electric was renamed AT&T Technologies and was divided into several units focused on specific customer groups, such as AT&T Network Systems and AT&T Consumer Products. It, along with Bell Labs, would be fully merged and absorbed into American Telephone and Telegraph Company in 1991.

In 1991, AT&T discontinued telegraph services.

After its own attempt to penetrate the computer marketplace failed, in 1991, AT&T acquired NCR Corporation (National Cash Register), hoping to capitalize on the burgeoning personal computer and Unix networked server markets, but was unable to extract lasting financial or technological gains from the merger. After deregulation of the U.S. telecom industry via the Telecommunications Act of 1996, NCR was divested again. At the same time, the majority of AT&T Technologies and the renowned Bell Labs was spun off as Lucent Technologies. The industry as a whole had many other reorganizations since the 1990s, both due to deregulation and because of technological advances reducing demand and pricing power in telecommunications.

In 1992, AT&T Technologies received the Shingo Prize for Excellence in Manufacturing at the Microelectronics Dallas, Texas Power Systems plant.

In October 1992, AT&T was the first company to win two Malcolm Baldridge National Quality Awards in the same year. One award was for the service category through AT&T Universal Card Services, based in Jacksonville, Florida, and the other was for the quality manufacturing process of AT&T Network Systems/Transmission Systems, a business unit based in Morristown, New Jersey. The chairman of the company indicated AT&T implemented operations in 1989, based on the Baldridge standard, to achieve this goal actually for a 1994 application.

In 1994, AT&T purchased the largest cellular carrier, McCaw Cellular, for $11.5 billion and kick-started its cellular division with 2 million subscribers.

In 1994, AT&T Technologies received the Shingo Prize for Excellence in Manufacturing at the Microelectronics Orlando, Florida, plant.

In 1995, AT&T purchased long-distance provider Alaska Communications System. FCC approval required the company be run as an AT&T subsidiary rather than a more likely absorption into AT&T Communications, giving the company the AT&T Alascom name.

In 1997, AT&T hired former IBM executive C Michael Armstrong as its chief executive officer. Armstrong's vision was to change AT&T from a long-distance carrier into a global "telecommunications supermarket", eying Internet services for the booming dot-com industry.

Armstrong's most prominent strategy was buying significant cable television assets. After acquiring John Malone's TCI and Media One (gaining through the latter a 25% share of Time Warner Cable), AT&T was the largest provider of cable television in the world. It intended to use these assets to bridge the so-called "last mile" and break the Regional Bell Companies' access-monopoly of the consumer household for data and telephony services, but the wager was costly, substantially increasing the company's debt. AT&T acquired TCI in a $48 billion all-stock transaction including the assumption of $16 billion of debt. AT&T acquired MediaOne for $54 billion in cash and stock, after a bidding war with Comcast.

In 1998, the company took over Teleport Communications Group, a company founded in 1985 to compete with New York Telephone Company using fiber optics. That same year, AT&T announced a US$1 billion alliance with BT to offer global voice over IP (VoIP) services, called Concert, sparking rumors of a potential merger. But the parties fought for control of the project and could not even agree on the alliance's name. By mid-2001, customers were being directed to sign contracts with the parent companies, and Concert Communications Services, as the venture was eventually known, was scrapped in October that year.

In 1999, AT&T acquired the Olivetti & Oracle Research Lab, from Olivetti and Oracle Corporation. In 2002, it closed down the research part of the lab.

Also in 1999, AT&T paid US$5 billion to purchase IBM's Global Network business, which became AT&T Global Network Services, LLC. As part of the purchase agreement, IBM granted AT&T a five-year, US$5-billion contract to handle much of IBM's networking needs, and AT&T outsourced some of its application processing and data management work to IBM. IBM also committed to billing and installation for AT&T's long-distance customers in a 10-year deal valued at US$4 billion; and assumed management of AT&T's data processing centers.

With long-distance rates falling and the market for telecommunications services overall weakening, AT&T could not sustain the debt it had incurred in these ventures. Moreover, the cost of upgrading TCI's equipment to handle two-way communications proved far higher than pre-merger estimates. AT&T undertook a major reorganization in October 2000, moving its mobile phone and broadband units into separate companies, to allow each unit to raise capital independently.

The logo for AT&T Comcast, the original name for the AT&T Broadband/Comcast merger

On July 9, 2001, it spun off AT&T Wireless Services in what was then the world's largest initial public offering (IPO). Later that year it spun off AT&T Broadband and Liberty Media, which comprised its cable TV assets. AT&T Broadband was subsequently acquired by Comcast in 2002, and AT&T Wireless merged with Cingular Wireless LLC in 2004. The merged wireless phone company operated as Cingular until 2007 when it became AT&T Mobility.

In 2004, the U.S. government eliminated equal access regulations that allowed long-distance phone companies to access the networks owned by the regional Bell carriers at fixed rates. This ultimately caused AT&T to move away from the residential telephone business — declaring in the process that it would no longer market residential telephone service. Instead, its residential focus shifted to offering a voice service over a broadband Internet connection called AT&T CallVantage.

== Rise of SBC ==
One of the new companies formed by the breakup of AT&T was Southwestern Bell Corporation. This company grew continuously over the years until it acquired AT&T in 2005. After this acquisition, SBC took on AT&T's name and branding, and this is the company known as AT&T today.

=== 1984–2001: Southwestern Bell Corporation ===
American Telephone and Telegraph Company officially transferred full ownership of Southwestern Bell Telephone Company to Southwestern Bell Corporation on January 1, 1984. It had three other subsidiaries: Southwestern Bell Publications, Inc., a directory publisher; Southwestern Bell Mobile Systems, Inc., in the business of mobile telephone service; and Southwestern Bell Telecommunications, Inc., focusing on marketing phone equipment to business customers. The holding company's new president was Zane Edison Barnes.

In 1987, SBC bought Metromedia's cellular and paging business. That, in turn, boosted the company to the third-largest cellular communications company in the United States, behind McCaw Cellular and Pacific Telesis. In January 1990, Edward Whitacre took over as president of Southwestern Bell. Headquarters were moved from St. Louis to San Antonio, Texas, in February 1993. It acquired two cable companies in Maryland and Virginia from Hauser Communications for $650 million, becoming the first regional Bell telephone company to acquire a cable company outside its service area. In 1994, it called off a $1.6 billion acquisition attempt for 40% of Cox Cable because of FCC rules on cable companies. SBC would later start selling its current cable company interests.

=== 1995–2000: Changes to the company ===
SBC Communications logo, 2001–2005

In 1995, Southwestern Bell Corporation became SBC Communications Inc. They then absorbed the Southwestern Bell Telecom division (which made telephone equipment) into the company due to new FCC rules.

In 1996, SBC announced it would acquire Pacific Telesis Group, a Regional Bell Operating Company (RBOC) in California and Nevada. 1997 brought rumors of a proposed merger between AT&T Corporation (the USA's largest long-distance provider) and SBC (the USA's largest local provider). The FCC disapproved of the merger, and it came to end. Later in 1997, SBC sold its last two cable companies, exiting the cable telecom field.

In January 1998, SBC announced it would take over the Southern New England Telephone Company (SNET) for $4.4 billion in stock (the FCC would approve in October 1998). SBC also won a court judgment that would make it easier for RBOCs to enter the long-distance phone service, but it was being challenged by AT&T and the FCC. In May 1998, Ameritech and SBC announced a $62 billion merger, in which SBC would take over Ameritech. After making several organizational changes (such as the sale of Ameritech Wireless to GTE) to satisfy state and federal regulators, the two merged on October 8, 1999. The FCC later fined SBC Communications $6 million for failure to comply with agreements made in order to secure approval of the merger. SBC became the largest RBOC until the Bell Atlantic and the GTE merger. 1998 revenues were $46 billion, placing SBC among the top 15 companies in the Fortune 500.

In January 1999, SBC announced it would purchase Comcast Cellular, for $1.7 billion, plus $1.3 billion of debt. During 1999 SBC continued to prepare to be allowed to provide long-distance phone service. In February SBC acquired up to ten percent of Williams Companies' telecommunications division for about $500 million, who were building a fiber-optic network across the country and would carry SBC's future service. On November 1, 1999, SBC became a part of the Dow Jones Industrial Average (lasting through 2015).

=== 2000–2005: One national brand, and acquisition of AT&T Corporation ===
In 2002, SBC ended marketing its operating companies under different names, and simply opted to give its companies different doing business as names based on the state (a practice already in use by Ameritech since 1993), and it gave the holding companies it had purchased d/b/a names based on their general region.

On January 31, 2005, SBC announced that it would purchase AT&T Corporation for more than US$16 billion. The announcement came almost eight years after SBC and AT&T (originally known as the American Telephone and Telegraph Company) called off their first merger talks and nearly a year after initial merger talks between AT&T Corp. and BellSouth fell apart. AT&T stockholders' meeting in Denver, approved the merger on June 30, 2005. The U.S. Department of Justice cleared the merger on October 27, 2005, and the Federal Communications Commission approved it on October 31, 2005.

The merger was finalized on November 18, 2005. The merger left SBC as the nominal survivor. However, the merged company took the better-known AT&T name and branding, changing its corporate name to AT&T Inc. to differentiate the company from the former AT&T Corporation. On December 1, 2005, the merged company's New York Stock Exchange ticker symbol was changed from "SBC" to the traditional "T" used by AT&T.

While the new AT&T claims the old AT&T's history (dating to 1885) as its own, it retains SBC's corporate structure and pre-2005 stock price history. All pre-2005 regulatory filings are for Southwestern Bell/SBC, not AT&T.

The new AT&T updated the former AT&T's graphic logo (a new "marble" designed by Interbrand took over the "Death Star"); however, the existing AT&T sound trademark (voiced by Pat Fleet) continues to be used.

=== 2006: BellSouth acquisition ===
The BellSouth logo

On Friday December 29, 2006, the Federal Communications Commission (FCC) approved the new AT&T's acquisition of a regional Bell Operating Company, BellSouth, valued at approximately $86 billion (or 1.325 shares of AT&T for each share of BellSouth at the close of trading December 29, 2006). The new combined company retained the name AT&T. The deal consolidated ownership of both Cingular Wireless, which had purchased AT&T's cellular service in 2004, and Yellowpages.com. Cingular reassumed the AT&T name and all of BellSouth's other properties also took the AT&T branding.

=== 2007–2008: restructuring ===
==== Transition to new media ====
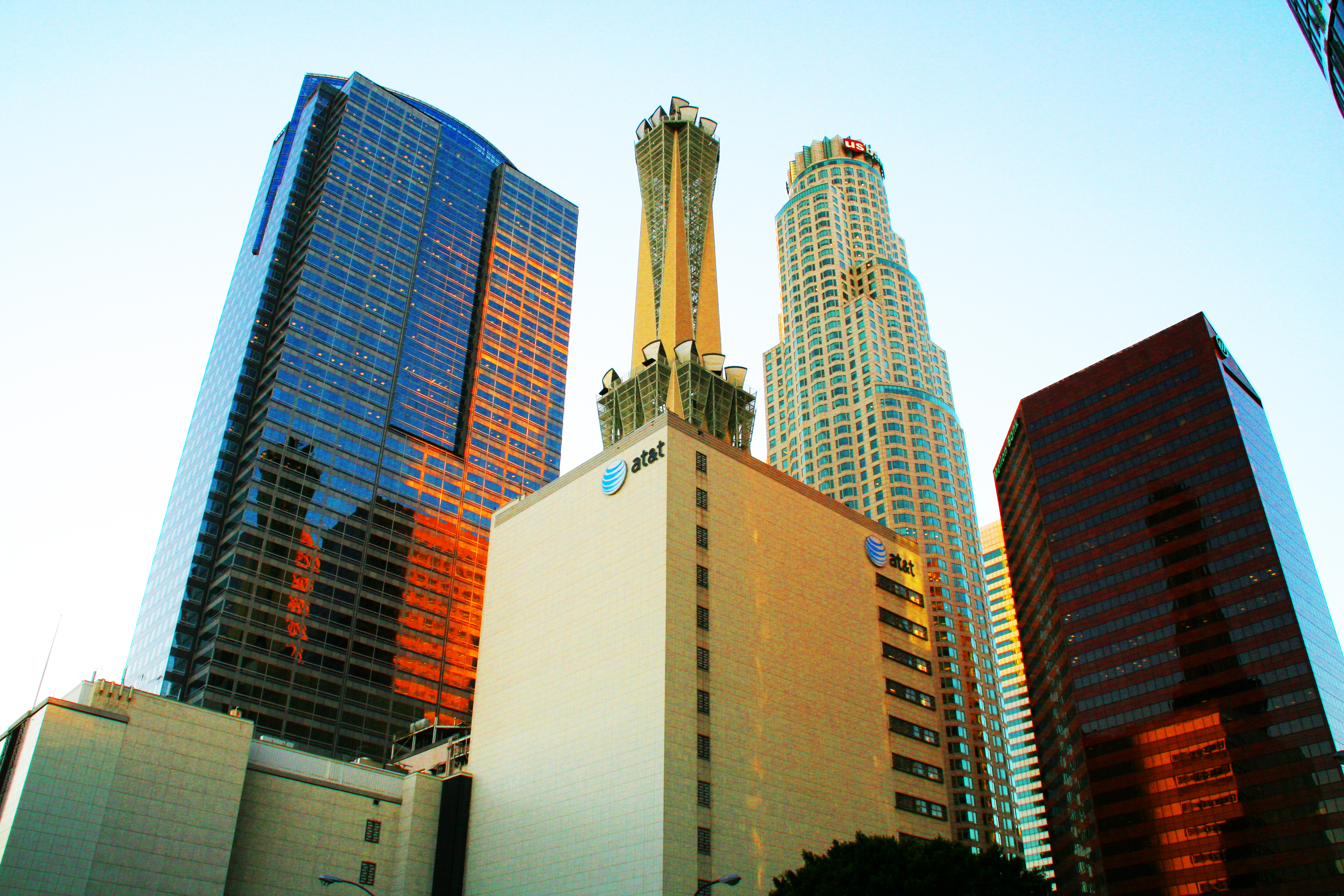
The AT&T Switching Center in Downtown Los Angeles

In June 2007, AT&T's new chairman and CEO, Randall Stephenson, discussed how wireless services are the core of "The New AT&T". With declining sales of traditional home phone lines, AT&T plans to roll out various new media such as Video Share, U-verse, and to extend its reach in high speed Internet into rural areas across the country. AT&T announced on June 29, 2007, however, that it was acquiring Dobson Communications. It was then reported on October 2, 2007, that AT&T would purchase Interwise for $121 million, which it completed on November 2, 2007. Interwise was a leading global provider of voice, Web and video conferencing services to businesses. On October 9, 2007, AT&T purchased 12 MHz of spectrum in the prime 700 MHz spectrum band from privately held Aloha Partners for nearly $2.5 billion; the deal was approved by the FCC on February 4, 2008. On December 4, 2007, AT&T announced plans to acquire Edge Wireless, a regional GSM carrier in the Pacific Northwest. The Edge Wireless acquisition was completed in April 2008.

==== Headquarters moves and job cuts ====
On June 27, 2008, AT&T announced that it would move its corporate headquarters from 175 East Houston Street in Downtown San Antonio to One AT&T Plaza in Downtown Dallas. The company said that it moved to gain better access to its customers and operations throughout the world, and to the key technology partners, suppliers, innovation and human resources needed as it continues to grow, domestically and internationally. AT&T Inc. previously relocated its corporate headquarters to San Antonio from St. Louis in 1992 when it was then named Southwestern Bell Corporation. The company's Telecom Operations group, which serves residential and regional business customers in 22 U.S. states, remains in San Antonio. Atlanta continues to be the headquarters for AT&T Mobility, with significant offices in Redmond, Washington, the former home of AT&T Wireless. Bedminster, New Jersey, which was the HQ for the original AT&T Corporation, is now the headquarters for the company's Global Business Services group and AT&T Labs. St. Louis continues as home to the company's Directory operations, AT&T Advertising Solutions.

On December 4, 2008, AT&T announced they would be cutting 12,000 jobs due to "economic pressures, a changing business mix and a more streamlined organizational structure".

== Post-consolidation wireless acquisitions ==
=== 2007: Cellular One acquisition ===
On June 29, 2007, AT&T announced that they had reached an agreement to purchase Dobson Cellular, which provided services in the US under the name Cellular One in primarily rural areas. The closing price was $2.8B USD, or $13 per share. AT&T also agreed to assume the outstanding debt of $2.3B USD. The sale completed on November 15, 2007, with market transition beginning December 9, 2007.

=== 2008: Centennial and Wayport acquisitions ===
On November 11, 2008, AT&T announced a $944 million buyout of Centennial Communications Corp. The acquisition is subject to regulatory approval, the approval of Centennial's stockholders and other customary closing conditions. Welsh, Carson, Anderson & Stowe, Centennial's largest stockholder, has agreed to vote in support of this transaction. In an attempt to quell regulators, on May 9, 2009, AT&T entered an agreement with Verizon Wireless to sell off certain existing Centennial service areas in the states of Louisiana and Mississippi for $240 million pending the successful merger of AT&T and Centennial.

On December 12, 2008, AT&T acquired Wayport, Inc., a major provider of Internet hotspots in the United States. With the acquisition, AT&T's public Wi-Fi deployment climbed to 20,000 hotspots in the United States, the most of any U.S. provider.

=== 2011: Qualcomm spectrum purchase ===
On December 20, 2011, AT&T and Qualcomm announced that AT&T would buy $1.93 billion worth of spectrum from Qualcomm. Formerly used for FLO TV, this spectrum will be used to expand AT&T's 4G wireless services. AT&T already had spectrum for the purpose close to what it is buying.

=== 2011: Attempted acquisition of T-Mobile USA ===
On March 20, 2011, AT&T announced its intention to buy T-Mobile USA for $39 billion from Deutsche Telekom. The deal would have seen the addition of 33.7 million subscribers, making AT&T Mobility the largest mobile phone company in the United States. AT&T Mobility would have had a 43% market share of mobile phones in the U.S. making AT&T Mobility significantly larger than any of its competitors. Regulators questioned the effects such a deal would have had on both competitors and consumers. AT&T CEO Randall Stephenson however stated that the merger would increase network quality and would lead to large savings for the company. AT&T stated it may have had to sell some assets to gain approval from regulators, but claimed to have done their "homework" on regulations.

Reaction to the announced merger generated both support as well as opposition among various groups and communities.

The merger gained support from a wide number of civil rights, environmental, and business organizations. These include the NAACP, League of United Latin American Citizens, Gay & Lesbian Alliance Against Defamation (GLAAD), and the Sierra Club. Labor organizations such as the AFL–CIO, Teamsters, and the Communications Workers of America also voiced support for the merger. These organizations pointed to AT&T's commitment to labor, social, and environmental standards. Many of these organizations also cited how the merger is likely to accelerate 4G wireless deployment, thus helping underserved communities such as rural areas and disadvantaged urban communities. According to the NAACP, the merger would have "advance[d] increased access to affordable and sustainable wireless broadband services and in turn stimulate job creation and civic engagement throughout our country."

By August 2, 2011, the governors of 26 states had written letters supporting the merger. On July 27 the attorneys general of Utah, Alabama, Arkansas, Georgia, Kentucky, Michigan, Mississippi, North Dakota, South Dakota, West Virginia, and Wyoming sent a joint letter of support to the FCC. By August 2011 state regulatory agencies in Arizona and Louisiana approved the acquisition.

A diverse group of industry and public-interest organizations opposed AT&T's merger with T-Mobile. Consumer groups including Public Knowledge, Consumers Union, Free Press, and the Media Access Project publicly opposed the AT&T merger. These groups attempted to persuade a majority of the Federal Communications Commission and members of Congress. These organizations feared that the merger will raise prices and stifle innovation by consolidating so much of the wireless industry in one company. Free Press and Public Knowledge started letter-writing campaigns against the deal.

Internet companies were generally skeptical of the merger because it leaves them with fewer counter-parties to negotiate with for getting their content and applications to customers. The AT&T merger might leave them dependent on just two, AT&T, and Verizon. The Computer & Communication Industry Association (CCIA), which counts Google, Microsoft, Yahoo and eBay among its members, opposed the merger. "A deal like this, if not blocked on antitrust grounds, is of deep concern to all the innovative businesses that build everything from apps to handsets. It would be hypocritical for our nation to talk about unleashing innovation on one hand and then stand by as threats to innovation like this are proposed," said Ed Black, head of CCIA.

On April 21, 2011, AT&T defended its proposed acquisition of T-Mobile USA before a U.S. Senate committee, saying the combined company would deliver high-speed wireless services to 97 percent of Americans and provide consumer benefits such as fewer dropped calls.

As part of the original negotiations, if AT&T's acquisition of T-Mobile USA were to be rejected by federal regulators, AT&T would need to pay $6 billion, including $3 billion in cash, to T-Mobile USA's parent company Deutsche Telekom.

On August 31, 2011, the Department of Justice officially filed a lawsuit in the United States District Court for the District of Columbia seeking to block the acquisition.

On November 30, 2011, the FCC allowed AT&T to withdraw their merger, saving both carriers from divulging documentation about internal operations. The FCC cited job loss and higher consumer prices as reasons to deny the merger.

On December 19, 2011, AT&T announced that it would permanently end its merger bid after a "thorough review of its options". As per the original acquisition agreement, T-Mobile will receive $3 billion in cash as well as access to $1 billion worth of AT&T-held wireless spectrum.

=== 2013–2014: Leap Wireless acquisition ===
On July 12, 2013, AT&T announced it is agreeing to acquire Leap Wireless (Cricket) for $1.2 billion. The deal says AT&T will be acquiring all of Leap's towers, stores and their 5.3 million subscribers. The merger between AT&T and Leap Wireless was approved by the Federal Communications Commission on March 13, 2014.

== Recent developments (2013–present) ==
In September 2013, AT&T announced it would expand into Latin America through a collaboration with Carlos Slim's América Móvil. On December 17, 2013, AT&T announced plans to sell its Connecticut wireline operations to Stamford-based Frontier Communications. Roughly 2,700 wireline employees supporting AT&T's operations in Connecticut were expected to transfer with the business to Frontier, as well as 900,000 voice connections, 415,000 broadband connections, and 180,000 U-verse video subscribers.

On May 18, 2014, AT&T announced it had agreed to purchase DirecTV for $48.5 billion, or $67.1 billion including assumed debt. The deal was aimed at increasing AT&T's market share in the pay-TV sector and give AT&T access to fast-growing Latin American markets. The transaction closed in July 2015. The deal is subject to conditions for four years, including a requirement for AT&T to expand its fiberoptic broadband service to at least 12.5 million customer locations, not to discriminate against other online video services using bandwidth caps, submit any "interconnection agreements" for government review, and offer low-cost internet services for low-income households. AT&T subsequently announced plans to converge its existing U-verse home internet and IPTV brands into a combined platform with DirecTV, tentatively known as AT&T Entertainment.

On November 7, 2014, AT&T announced its purchase of Iusacell to create a wider North American network. In January 2015, AT&T announced it would be acquiring the bankrupt Mexican wireless business of NII Holdings for around $1.875 billion. AT&T subsequently merged the two companies to create AT&T Mexico.

On March 6, 2015, it was announced that AT&T will be removed from the Dow Jones Industrial Average, being replaced by Apple.

On October 20, 2016, it was reported that AT&T was in talks to acquire Time Warner, in an effort to increase its media holdings. On October 22, 2016, AT&T announced a deal to buy Time Warner for $108.7 billion. If approved by federal regulators, the merger would bring AT&T's telecommunication holdings under the same umbrella as HBO, Turner Broadcasting System and the Warner Bros. studio.

On February 15, 2017, Time Warner shareholders approved the merger. On February 28, FCC Chairman Ajit Pai announced that his agency will not review the deal, leaving the review to the US Department of Justice.

On March 15, 2017, the European Commission approved the merger.

On July 13, 2017, it was reported that AT&T is going to introduce a cloud-based DVR streaming service as part of its effort to create a unified platform across DirecTV and its DirecTV Now streaming service, with U-verse to be added soon.

On August 22, 2017, the merger was approved by Mexican authorities. On September 5, 2017, the merger was approved by Chilean authorities.

On September 12, 2017, it was reported that AT&T is planning to launch a brand new cable TV-like service for delivery over-the-top over its own or a competitor's broadband network sometime next year.

On October 23, 2017, the deadline was extended for a short period of time to finalize the deal. The original deadline was on October 22. On November 28, 2017, it was announced that the merger would be extended until April 2018.

On November 8, 2017, the United States Department of Justice informed AT&T and Time Warner that they must sell either DirecTV or Turner Broadcasting System, the group of channels that includes CNN, if they want approval for their $84.5 billion merger, according to a New York Times report citing people briefed on the matter. AT&T CEO Randall Stephenson told Business Insider on November 8 that he had no plans to do that. On November 20, 2017, Assistant Attorney General Makan Delrahim filed a lawsuit under the Clayton Act of 1914 to block the acquisition.

On January 31, 2018, it was reported that AT&T's next generation update of DirecTV Now will launch sometime this Spring.

On March 7, 2018, the company prepared to sell a minority stake of DirecTV Latin America through an IPO, creating a new holding company for those assets named Vrio Corp. However, on April 18, just a day before the public debut of Vrio, AT&T canceled the IPO due to market conditions.

On March 13, 2018, it was reported that AT&T had filed a trademark for "AT&T TV" with the U.S. Patent & Trademark Office, a possible signal that the telco company will finally eliminate its current brand names DirecTV and U-verse.

On June 14, 2018, the acquisition of Time Warner was completed, and Time Warner was renamed to WarnerMedia. In September 2018, AT&T then reorganized operations into four main units: Communications, including consumer and business wireline telephony, AT&T Mobility, and consumer entertainment video services; WarnerMedia, including Turner cable television networks, Warner Bros. film and television production, and HBO; AT&T Latin America, consisting of wireless service in Mexico and video in Latin America and the Caribbean under the Vrio brand; and Advertising and Analytics, since renamed Xandr.

On February 26, 2019, it was announced that the D.C. Circuit Court of Appeals uphold the AT&T acquisition of Time Warner.

By 2019, AT&T had developed partnerships with health care providers to develop mobile health-related connectivity devices that aid inpatient care. Key products include a telemetry device that monitors patient metrics, while toggling between WIFI and cellular connectivity.

On April 24, 2020, AT&T announced that effective July 1, 2020, company COO John Stankey will replace Randall Stephenson as CEO of AT&T. It was also acknowledged that AT&T's acquisitions of DirectTV and Time Warner had by this point resulted in a massive debt burden of $200 billion for the company.

As a result of planned cost cutting programs, the sale of Warner Bros. Interactive Entertainment was proposed, but ultimately abandoned due to COVID-19 related growth in the Gaming industry, as well as a positive reception to upcoming DC Comics, Lego Star Wars, and Harry Potter titles from fans and critics.

Crunchyroll was sold to Sony's Funimation for US$1.175 billion in December 2020, with the acquisition closing in August 2021.

On December 25, 2020, a bombing in Nashville, Tennessee, caused AT&T service outages across the U.S., but primarily in Middle Tennessee. Cellular, wireline telephone, Internet, and U-verse television services were affected due to infrastructure damage to an AT&T service facility located near the blast site.

In January 2021, AT&T announced that, due to the COVID-19 pandemic, around 300 jobs might get affected as it was planning to cut its workforce in Slovakia.

On February 25, 2021, AT&T announced that it would spin-off DirecTV, U-Verse TV, and DirecTV Stream into a separate entity, selling a 30% stake to TPG Capital (owners of Astound Broadband cable), while retaining a 70% stake in the new standalone company. The deal was closed on August 2, 2021.

In May 2021, AT&T announced it will spin off WarnerMedia which will merge with Discovery, Inc. for $43 billion. The merger was completed on April 8, 2022. The acquisition of Time Warner has been calculated to have lost AT&T shareholders $47 billion, as AT&T was worth $109 billion when the deal closed and the stake AT&T shareholders received of Warner Bros Discovery amounted to less than $20 billion.

Electronic Arts, who were a bidder in the proposed sale of Warner Bros Interactive Entertainment, purchased the mobile gaming studio Playdemic from WBIE for US$1.4 billion in June 2021.

On December 21, 2021, AT&T announced that they had agreed to sell Xandr (and AppNexus) to Microsoft for an undisclosed price, subject to customary closing conditions, including regulatory reviews. The deal was completed in June 2022.

On February 22, 2024, cellular service was disrupted across the United States with "millions" unable to connect to the cellular network. Municipalities reported that AT&T customers were unable to place calls to emergency services, even when using their phone's SOS capability. The blackout prompted the FBI and Department of Homeland Security to launch investigations into the possibility of a cyber attack being the cause of the blackout. AT&T however later claimed that it wasn't the result of a cyber attack, but rather a poorly timed server update Users were later compensated credit as a result of the outage. In March, the FCC opened an investigation into the outage.

On September 30, 2024, AT&T announced that it would selling its remaining 70% stake in DirecTV to TPG. The sale was completed on July 2, 2025.

On May 21, 2025, AT&T announced an agreement to purchase Lumen Technologies' mass-market consumer broadband connectivity business. When completed in 2026, this transaction will bring most of former Baby Bell US West territory into AT&T’s terrestrial service footprint.

On October 13, 2026, AT&T announced that it would sell AT&T Mexico to Televisa and Fintech Holdings for $2 billion. The sale is expected to be complete in the Q1 2027.

== See also ==
- AT&T
