= CAL (programming language) =

Programming language

CAL, short for Conversational Algebraic Language, was a programming language and system designed and developed by Butler Lampson at Berkeley in 1967 for the SDS 940 mainframe computer. CAL is a version of the seminal JOSS language with several cleanups and new features to take advantage of the SDS platform.

The Berkeley SDS was used for the development of the Tymshare commercial time-sharing platform and an improved version of CAL was offered as a programming environment to its customers in 1969. Although CAL saw "almost no use", it had a lasting impact by influencing the design of Tymshare SUPER BASIC which copied a number of its features. Some of those features, in turn, appeared in BASIC-PLUS on the PDP-11, which is the direct ancestor of Microsoft BASIC.

== Description ==
=== Basic concepts ===
JOSS had been designed to be used by non-programmers in the US Air Force and within Rand Corporation, and to aid with that, Rand designed to custom computer terminals that were easier to set up and use. These terminals, based on the IBM Selectric typewriter, also included a custom character set that implemented common mathematical symbols like ≥ and ≠.

To a large degree, CAL was a version of JOSS that replaced these sorts of customizations with more common solutions like >= and # so they could run on common terminals. The other noticeable differences were that CAL was all upper-case, as opposed to sentence casing in JOSS, and it did not require a period at the end of the line. The commands were otherwise almost identical and the overall structure and syntax were the same.

As with JOSS, CAL had an interactive user interface that allowed the user to type in statements in "direct mode" or programs to be run in "indirect mode". In BASIC, the former is more commonly referred to as "immediate mode". Both CAL and JOSS used a two-part line number, known as the part and step, separated by a period, for instance, 1.100 for part 1 step 100. Parts were generally used to group related statements into subroutines. In CAL, the part number could be between 0 and 999999, and the step from 0 to 99999.

There were two main versions of CAL, released in 1967 and 1969. The following description will be based primarily on the former version unless otherwise noted.

=== Jumps and subroutines ===
As in JOSS, CAL supported the TO command to branch to a provided part or step, as in TO PART 3 or TO STEP 4.5, and DO for subroutine calls, as in DO PART 9 to perform the entire part, or DO STEP 5.1 to run that single step and then return. The later syntax was useful when there were many small subroutines as they could be implemented on a single line without an associated RETURN or similar concept.

=== Conditional branching and assignment ===
One of the more notable syntactic features of JOSS was the concept of "statement modifiers" which controlled the operation of other statements. JOSS used this for conditional branching.

In most languages, one would write something to the effect of "If this expression is true, then do this...". In JOSS, this order was reversed, and such statements took the form "do this if this is true", for instance, Type "HELLO" if X=5.. CAL added some syntactic sugar to this basic concept by adding the new modifier UNLESS, which, depending on the context, led to more obvious code; TYPE "IT IS NOT EQUAL TO FIVE" UNLESS X=5.

In JOSS, to assign the value 5 to a variable A if the value of B was larger than 10, and 0 otherwise, the code would be:

Set A=5 if B>10.
Set A=0 if B<=10.

CAL also supported conditional expressions:

A=IF B>10 THEN 5 ELSE 0

A similar modification was the WHERE statement, used to set variables as part of an if or for. It was similar in concept to the if/then/else structure, but could have any number of items. For instance,=A*B WHERE A=B UNTIL A>20, WHERE A=1 UNTIL A>100.

=== Loops ===
Looping in JOSS was also controlled by a modifier, the For. This used somewhat obscure syntax from FORTRAN; Type i for i=1(2)10. runs a loop from 1 to 10 stepping by 2, so it would print 1,3,5,7,9. One could also supply explicit values, Type i for i=1,5,6,7,10., or mix the two, Type i for i=1,5(1)7,10.

CAL improved on JOSS' syntax by introducing the BY and TO keywords, so the equivalent code in CAL would be TYPE I FOR I=1 BY 2 TO 10. In JOSS, the parenthesis around the step value was the separator for the two limits, so it could not be made optional. By separating out TO the limits became explicit and the BY was made optional as assumed to be 1; TYPE I FOR I=1 TO 10. As with JOSS, explicit values and ranges could be used; TYPE I FOR I=1,5 TO 7,10. CAL further modified the for loop by adding conditional exits, using WHILE and UNTIL. For instance, TYPE A FOR A=1 BY 1 WHILE A<=50 or TYPE B FOR B=1 UNTIL A=50.

=== User-defined functions ===
JOSS allowed the user to define functions using the Let statement. The syntax allowed local variables to be named in the function signature; Let F(X,Y)=X+Y. Programs could then call these functions as if they were built-in, Set A=F(1,5).

CAL changed Let to DEFINE, which is much more obvious, and made a more minor change the parameters were passed in using braces instead of parenthesis, so the equivalent definition would be DEFINE F[X,Y]=X+Y and called in the same way, SET A=F[1,5].

A more important change to CAL's functions was the ability to call subroutines from the definitions using TO, as in DEFINE F(X,Y) : TO PART 5. (Note: Given that DO is normally used to call subroutines, it is not obvious why they chose TO in this case.) This left the issue of assigning the resulting calculated value back to the function, which was addressed with the introduction of the RETURN Z statement at the end of the part, where Z is the final value to be returned.

=== Other changes ===
CAL included the mathematical functions of JOSS but added several new ones including ABS, TAN, ATAN, and LOG10. It added a new operator as well, MOD, which returned the remainder of a division of its two operands.

=== Direct mode ===
CAL added a small number of direct mode commands and associated statements.

PAUSE, when encountered in a program, printed a message "PAUSED AT STEP 1.1" and then returned to direct mode. This was similar to the STOP command in BASIC. This allowed the user to type in values and continue execution with GO. While in direct mode, the user could STEP by a single line at a time to trace the execution of the program.

=== Improvements in CAL 1969 ===
One minor change in the 1969 version was the elimination of the SET command for variable assignment. This had been optional in direct mode in JOSS but was required in program statements, and the 1967 version of CAL followed this rule. The 1969 version made it optional in both cases.
