= BP2 =

BP2 may refer to:

- Bipolar II disorder (BP-II)
- South View LRT station (BP2), Singapore
- BPD, also known as BP2, a Mazda B engine
- BP2 combination problem, a Binding problem in neuroscience, cognitive science and philosophy of mind
- BASIC Plus 2 programming language

== See also ==
- The Blueprint 2: The Gift & The Curse, a 2002 album by Jay-Z
- Black Panther: Wakanda Forever, also known as Black Panther 2
