= David Dorman =

American telecommunications executive

David W. Dorman
- Born: 1954 (age 71–72); Georgia, U.S.
- Education: Georgia Institute of Technology
- Occupation: Executive
- Spouse: Susan
- Children: 3

David W. Dorman (born 1954) is an American Telecommunications executive and founding partner of Centerview Capital Technology Partners. Dorman is currently Non-Executive Chairman of the Board of CVS Health Corporation and serves on the boards of PayPal, Yum! Brands and the Georgia Tech Foundation. Dorman was a board member of Motorola since 2006, was elected Non-Executive Chairman of the Board in 2008 and retired from his board position in May 2015. Dorman also was a board member of Scientific Atlanta until the company was acquired by Cisco Systems in 2006.

== Early life and education ==
Dorman was born in Georgia, and graduated from the Georgia Institute of Technology in 1975 with a bachelor's degree in industrial management.

== Career ==
Dorman joined a company that was to become Sprint Communications in 1981 as employee number 55. He climbed the corporate ladder to become President of Sprint Business - with 10,000 employees and revenues of $4.5Bn by the time he was 35.

Dorman became the youngest CEO of a Baby Bell company at the age of 39 following the decision to join Pacific Bell as President & CEO in 1994. The company was acquired by SBC Communications in 1997, and Dorman resigned shortly thereafter to join early news aggregation service PointCast as CEO. Despite lofty expectations PointCast failed to deliver on its potential, and Dorman subsequently left to become CEO of Concert Communications Services, a joint venture between BT and AT&T.

=== Tenure at AT&T ===
Dorman became CEO of AT&T after his predecessor, C. Michael Armstrong, joined Comcast as part of the company's acquisition of AT&T's broadband assets during the summer of 2002. The broadband disposition was one of many high-profile transactions made during Armstrong's tenure. Other notable moves include the acquisition of TCI, Inc in 1998 for $48 billion, and the spin-off of the wireless business into Cingular in 2001.

The early part of Dorman's tenure as CEO was spent restructuring a stressed balance sheet, and re-positioning the company's product mix in response to dramatic changes in the competitive environment. Ultimately, the decision was made to position AT&T as an enterprise services company in the hope that such a move would make the business more attractive to potential acquirers. After an attempt to sell the business to BellSouth fell through, Dorman was able to reach terms with SBC to acquire AT&T during late 2004. Although he initially agreed to join SBC as a President, Dorman ultimately elected to pursue other opportunities and parted ways with the business shortly after the acquisition was finalized.
