= Ann Hardy =

American computer programmer (1933–2023)

- Born: Ann Caryl Haley; April 20, 1933; Chicago, Illinois U.S.
- Died: December 7, 2023 (aged 90); Palo Alto, California, U.S.
- Other name: Ann Caryl Ewing Hardy
- Education: Pomona College
- Occupations: Programmer; Executive
- Years active: 1956–2023
- Spouse: Norm Hardy (1933-2018)
- Children: 2

Ann Hardy (née Haley, April 20, 1933 – December 7, 2023) was an American computer programmer and entrepreneur, best known for her pioneering work on computer time-sharing systems while working at Tymshare from 1966 onwards.

== Early life and education ==
Hardy was born in Chicago, Illinois on April 20, 1933. Her father had a small advertising agency and her mother, Ruth H. Ewing, was a high school math teacher and homemaker. Hardy was the eldest of five children in a conservative Methodist family. She grew up in Evanston, Illinois.

In 1951, Hardy graduated from Evanston Township High School. In 1955, Hardy graduated from Pomona College with a degree in physical education. She chose physical education because it was the only degree program which allowed her to take math and science courses after her desire to major in chemistry was stymied by the chemistry department head who was opposed to having women in the lab. Following her graduation, she took chemistry classes at Columbia University, but ultimately decided that a career in physical therapy had little appeal. On the advice of a friend working for IBM, she took the company's Programmer Aptitude Test when searching for a job.

== Career ==
In 1956, Hardy entered the programming field after taking IBM's Programmer Aptitude Test. Her official title was System Service Girl, which is equivalent to the position of a current day system engineer. Hardy then switched to programming and worked in IBM Research, which was in Poughkeepsie, and then in Ossining, New York. She worked at IBM for five years.

A job on the STRETCH supercomputer project led to an offer to work at the Lawrence Radiation Laboratory in 1962. Hardy was one of a team of five who worked on the Livermore STRETCH's Fortran compiler from 1963 to 1966.

In February 1966, after her husband got a job at IBM in the Bay Area, Hardy got a job at Tymshare, a newly formed time-sharing company in Los Altos, California. She worked for Tymshare from 1966 to 1985.

Hardy worked on some of the first time-sharing systems and computer networks, used by a variety of corporations and government agencies. In 1968 she, with her husband Norm Hardy and LaRoy Tymes, first used minicomputers to log onto mainframe computers. She eventually rose to vice-president, the first woman in that role. Though Hardy was solely responsible for the writing the code for Tymshare's time-sharing product, many of her male colleagues assumed her husband had written the OS. It wasn't until she was in the hospital giving birth to her first child, and her coworkers encountered problems that they did not know how to fix, that they began to defer to her as the expert on the system she had written.

After Tymshare was acquired by McDonnell Douglas in 1984, she left to found KeyLogic, which sold the timesharing hardware and software developed at Tymshare, under a licensing arrangement, until changing market conditions forced its closure in the early 1990s. She subsequently co-founded Agorics, which focuses on web-based marketplace applications.

Hardy's experiences are representative of the state of gendered labor in the field of computing during the mid to late 20th century: despite having technical skills and proving their value as workers, women in computing were continually undervalued as the field rose in power and importance. While at IBM, at one point Hardy learned that she was being paid less than one-half of the salary of the lowest ranked man who reported to her. As historians like Nathan Ensmenger, Janet Abbate, and Mar Hicks have shown, women programmers were denied credit for their work and historically submerged, leading to an inaccurate view of men's and women's roles in the field.

In 2004, Hardy retired. She served as co-chair of the Software Industry Special Interest Group at the Computer History Museum.

== Personal life and death ==
Hardy married, and later divorced, Norman Hardy, also an alumnus of IBM and Tymshare. She had two daughters, born in 1968 and 1970; one became an environmentalist and the other a costume designer.

Hardy died in Palo Alto, California on December 7, 2023, at the age of 90.
