= C. Michael Armstrong =

American business executive

C Michael Armstrong (born October 18, 1938, in Detroit, Michigan) is an American business executive and former AT&T chairman and CEO. He was hired after Kenneth Lay turned down the job to continue managing Enron. He tried to reestablish AT&T as an end-to-end carrier but, due to the dot-com bust and various other issues, he was forced to break the group up in 2001. He resigned in 2002 and was succeeded by AT&T President David Dorman.

He is also the former CEO of Hughes Electronics, and Comcast Corporation. He worked for IBM from 1961 to 1992. He served as a Director of Citigroup from 1989 to 2010. Armstrong is a member of the Alfalfa Club and the Council on Foreign Relations. He received his BS in business at Miami University in 1961.

In 2000 he was a board member of Citigroup and voted to oust former Citicorp CEO, John S. Reed, in favor of Sandy Weill who was co-CEO with Reed at the time. Influential analyst Jack Grubman wrote an upgraded favorable opinion of AT&T which was a reversal of Grubman's opinion just prior to that time.
