= Tymshare =

Computer time-sharing service (1964–1984)

Tymshare, Inc was a time-sharing service and third-party hardware maintenance company. Competing with companies such as CompuServe, Service Bureau Corporation and National CSS. Tymshare developed and acquired various technologies, such as data networking, electronic data interchange (EDI), credit card and payment processing, and database technology. It was headquartered in Cupertino in California, from 1964 to 1984.

In 1984, Tymshare was acquired by McDonnell Douglas, to which Tymshare had sold its hospital accounting service in 1982. Tymshare was restructured, split up and portions were resold, spun off, and merged with other companies from 1984 through 2004 when most of its legacy network was eventually shut down. Islands of its network technology continued as part of EDI, into 2008.

McDonnell Douglas was acquired by Boeing. Consequently, rights to use technology developed by Tymshare are currently held by Boeing, British Telecom (BT), Verizon Communications, and AT&T Inc. due to the acquisitions and mergers from 1984 through 2005.

== History ==
=== Beginnings ===
Tymshare was founded in 1964 by Thomas O’Rourke and David Schmidt, two former employees of General Electric's Computer Department. The company was entering the new market of time-sharing, which at that time was expected to grow rapidly. GE would itself soon enter this market as well, after collaborating with Dartmouth College.

Tymshare initially focussed on the SDS 940 platform, initially running at University of California Berkeley. They received their own leased 940 in mid-1966, running the Berkeley Timesharing System, which had limited time-sharing capability. IBM Stretch programmer Ann Hardy rewrote the time-sharing system to service 32 simultaneous users. By 1969 the company had three locations, 100 staff, and five SDS 940s.

In 1968, LaRoy Tymes and Norm Hardy developed the idea of creating a network with minicomputers to communicate with the mainframes. The minicomputers started off as an inexpensive 12-bit computer from General Automation and soon became a more capable 16-bit Varian 620i—would serve as the network's nodes, running a program called a "supervisor" which routed data, performed diagnostics, and kept network statistics; a local program at each node, dubbed a "leprechaun," handled log-in, security, and diagnostics. The supervisor was written in assembly code by Tymes for the SDS 940, with architectural design contributions from Hardy in late 1969. The network became fully operational in 1970, and by 1972 the resulting Tymnet system connected 40 cities in the United States. Tymnet was a centralized network, unlike ARPANET; it featured centralized password storage, statistical multiplexing, flow management, and great attention to security issues.

Tymshare acquired a variety of companies during its 20 years of operation. One of the first, in 1968, was Dial Data, a time-sharing service bureau in Newton, Massachusetts, that had an additional five SDS 940 computers. Additional acquisitions included United Data Centers, Alan-Babcock Computing, Bancard of Rhode Island, and TeleCheck.

It soon became apparent that the SDS 940 could not keep up with the rapid growth of the network. In 1972, Joseph Rinde joined the Tymnet group and began porting the Supervisor code to the 32-bit Interdata 7/32, as the 8/32 was not yet ready. In 1973, the 8/32 became available, but the performance was disappointing, and a crash-effort was made to develop a machine that could run Rinde's Supervisor.

In the beginning of the 1970s Tymshare became available in Europe through CEGOS-Tymshare, a joint venture with Credit Lyonnais. It extended to Brussels in 1973. An operation in the United Kingdom started in 1974. In 1976, a joint venture with Taylorix Organisation, called Taylorix-Tymshare GmbH, was founded in Stuttgart, Germany. Taylorix-Tymshare offered applications, e.g., the eMail system "OnTyme" based on Tymnet, the multi-dimensional database system "Express" [now owned by Oracle, but no longer promoted ]. Marketing departments of some large companies (like Johnson&Johnson or BAT) used Express (available via type-writer in time-sharing mode, later on also available on PC) for the analysis of Nielsen or GfK sales data. Taylorix-Tymshare ceased operation in 1986.

In 1974, a second version of the Supervisor software became operational. The new Tymnet "Engine" software was used on both the Supervisor machines and on the nodes.

After the migration to Interdata, they started developing Tymnet on the PDP-10. Tymshare sold a copy of the Tymnet network software to TRW, which created its own private network, TRWNET.

In the 1970s, Tymshare, which had used Digital Equipment's operating system TOPS-10 for its PDP-10s, began independent work on the OS for their systems, called it TYMCOM-X, and implemented a file system that supported random access, paging with working sets, and spawnable processes. The OS work was done by a group of eleven people: Bill Weiher, Vance Socci, Allen Ginzburg, Karen Kolling, Art Atkinson, Gary Morgenthaler (founder of the company that produced INGRES), Todd Corenson, Murray Bowles, Randy Gobbel, Bill Soley, and Darren Price. Most Tymnet development was then done on TYMCOM-X. Also in the 1970s, Tymshare acquired the Augmentation Research Center from SRI International.

Tymes and Rinde then developed Tymnet II. Tymnet II ran in parallel with the original network, which continued to run on the Varian machines until it was phased out over a period of several years. Tymnet II's different method of constructing virtual circuits allowed for much better scalability.

=== Tymnet, Inc. spun off ===
In 1976, Tymnet Inc. was spun off from Tymshare Inc. and became an FCC "common carrier" which allowed it greater latitude as a communications service but placed its rate-setting under regulatory review. In this model, Tymnet allowed users to connect their host computers and terminals to the network, and use the computers from remote sites or sell time on their computers to other users of the network, with Tymnet charging them for the use of the network.

=== Tymshare sold to McDonnell Douglas ===
McDonnell Douglas Tymshare

In 1984, Tymnet was bought by the McDonnell Douglas Corporation as part of the acquisition of Tymshare. The company was renamed McDonnell Douglas Tymshare, and began a major reorganization. A year later, McDonnell Douglas (MD) split Tymshare into several separate operating companies: MD Network Systems Company, MD Field Service Company, MD RCS, MD... (in its different variants) and many more (this is sometimes referred to the Alphabet Soup phase of the company). By then, Tymnet had outlived its parent company, Tymshare.

McDonnell Douglas acquired Microdata and created McDonnell Douglas Information Systems Group (MDISC), expecting to turn Microdata's desktop and server systems along with Tymshare's servers and Tymnet data network into a major player in the Information Services market. Microdata's systems were integrated into many parts of McDonnell Douglas, but Tymnet never was. MDC really did not seem to understand the telecommunications market. After five years, peace was breaking out in many places in the world and McDonnell Douglas sold off MDNSC and MDFSC at a profit for much needed cash.

=== MDC Network Systems Company sold to British Telecom ===
BT Tymnet, BT North America, BTNA

On July 30, 1989, it was announced that British Telecom was purchasing McDonnell Douglas Network Systems Company, and McDonnell Douglas Field Service Company was being spun off as a start-up called NovaDyne. McDonnell Douglas was later acquired by Boeing. British Telecom (BT) wanted to expand and the acquisition of Tymnet which was already a worldwide data network helped to achieve that goal. On November 17, 1989 MDNSC officially became BT Tymnet with its headquarters in San Jose, California. BT brought with it the idea of continuous development with teams in America, Europe, and Asia-pacific all working together on the same projects. BT renamed the Tymnet services, Global Network Services (GNS).

British Telecom brought new life to the company with development of hardware and software for the Tymnet data network using contacts BT already had with telecommunication hardware vendors. There was also a trial of "next-generation" nodes scattered throughout the network, called "TURBO engine nodes" based on the Motorola 68000 family. In the mid to late 1980s, serious node-code development was migrated from the PDP-10s to UNIX. Sun-3 (based on the Motorola 68000) and later Sun-4 (SPARC based) workstations and servers were purchased from Sun Microsystems, though the majority of PDP-10s were still around in the early 1990s for legacy code, as well as documentation storage. Eventually, all of the code development sources were on the Sun-4s, and the development tools (NAD, etc.) had been ported to SunOS.

Another project begun a few months before the BT purchase was to migrate the Tymnet code repository from the PDP-10s to Sun systems. The new servers were dubbed the Code Generation Systems or CGS. They were initially six Sun-3/280 servers upgraded eventually to two Sun-4/690 servers for redundancy. A second pair of servers for catastrophic failover was also installed in Malvern, Pennsylvania and later moved to Norristown, Pennsylvania as part of later site consolidation efforts. After the migration, these servers managed source code and binary images for more than 6600 nodes and 38,000 customer interfaces worldwide.

Tymnet was still growing, and at several times reached its peak capacity when some of its customers held network intensive events. One of these of note was a live, on-line presentation and chat on America On-Line (AOL) with pop singer Michael Jackson. Tymnet usage statistics showed AOL's call capacity was greater than its maximum volume for the duration of the event.

=== BTNA sold/split into MCI, Concert, and BT ===
==== MCI, NewCo, Concert ====
In 1993 BT and MCI Communications (MCI) negotiated what they called the "Deal of the Century", where MCI would take ownership of the U.S.-based portions of Tymnet and they would create a joint venture called "Concert". (The joint venture was called "NewCo" for more than a year while they decided on a name). Concert was also aligned with another acquisition of BT, called Synchordia which was headquartered in Atlanta, Georgia. Tymnet was then referred to as The Packet network, the BT/MCI network and Concert Packet-switching Services (CPS). At first, MCI only wanted to use the points of presence (POPs) that Tymnet had, because there were locations in over 150 cities in the United States, giving MCI more locations from which to provide local service. As MCI cut away at Tymnet, expecting it to die, it became a cash cow that just wouldn't go away.

In May 1994, there were still three DEC KL-10s under TYMCOM-X. At this time, the network had approximately 5000 nodes in 30 foreign countries. A variety of protocols can be run over a single packet-switching-network, and Tymnet's most-used protocols were X.25, asynchronous terminal and host (ATI/AHI), and SNA.

BT and Concert also continued to develop the network, and after the failure of the "Turbo nodes" to take off, decided to have an outside company add Tymnet protocols to existing hardware used in their Frame Relay network. Telematics International developed a subset of the Tymnet protocols to run on their ACP/PCP nodes. The Telematics nodes were connected in a mesh network (every node logically connected to every other node) via frame-relay and appeared to Tymnet as super-nodes that were directly connected to as many as 44 other super-nodes interconnecting most of Europe, Asia and the Americas as a high speed data network.

MCI took a different direction and sought to migrate the network protocols to run over TCP/IP and use SPARC technology. The supervisor technology was rewritten in C to run as standard UNIX applications under Solaris. Funding for this project was at a minimum but the Tymnet engineers believed it was a superior method and proceeded anyway.

Times were changing and the Internet and World Wide Web were becoming a practical and even important part of corporate and personal life. Tymnet technology needed improvements to keep pace with TCP/IP and other Internet protocols. Both BT and MCI decided not to compete with the Internet, but to convert their customer base to IP-based networks and technologies.

==== MCI, MCI WorldCom, WorldCom vs. BT, Concert ====
In 1997 talks were underway for BT to acquire MCI. The deal fell through, and in September, 1998 MCI was acquired by WorldCom after they made a better offer for the company. Actually, the WorldCom offer was nearly identical to the BT offer, but where BT planned to buy out MCI shares of stock, WorldCom offered a stock-swap, which was more attractive to the stockholders. WorldCom took control in September 1998 and dissolved the BT/MCI alliance as of October 15, 1998.

==== Concert's headquarters in Reston, Virginia ====
With the alliance gone, BT and MCI WorldCom began the process of unraveling and separating their extensive voice and data communications systems.

Concert created Project Leonardo to separate the BT and MCI WorldCom voice and data networks. At times over the next five years, advancements were made or stalled due to BT and MCI management negotiating and renegotiating the terms of their contractual obligations to each other made during the alliance. At times, things came to a standstill, or decisions made were reversed, and some reversed again at a later time. Parts of the project were to migrate customers from X.25 to IP based networks, while others created a duplicate set of services so that both Concert and MCI could separately continue to run and manage their own portions of the network. Accounting data for network usage was also shared by the two companies and had to be separated before clients could be billed properly.

==== Concert and BT+AT&T's headquarters in Atlanta, Georgia ====
In 2000 BT then went searching for another alliance, and created a new Concert alliance between BT and AT&T, moving the headquarters to Atlanta, Georgia. This alliance did not help the negotiations between BT and MCI WorldCom as their partners from MCI and AT&T were corporate enemies. For Tymnet, the data network portion of the split, and the "CPS Leonardo" project, the split was never fully realized. Instead, MCI WorldCom completed their migration of services from Tymnet to IP based services in March 2003 and disconnected their supervisor nodes and their portion of the network on March 31, 2003. BT continued to run the network using their own supervisor and other utility nodes until February 2004 when their last customer was able to move all of its customers to other access services. BT and AT&T dissolved their Concert alliance on September 30, 2003 and the remaining BT assets were combined with BTNA assets into BT Americas, Inc. Sometime in early March 2004, without ceremony, BT Americas disconnected the last two remaining Tymnet supervisors from the network, effectively shutting it down.

MCI WorldCom still had a profitable segment of its business based on EDI technology. This technology used Tymnet to interface between Tandem computers using a non-standard x.25 interface and a high speed bi-synch modem used by the EDI customers. Prior to shutting down the MCI/WorldCom portion of Tymnet, they adapted the Tymnet Engine node code to permit internal connections between the x.25 interface and the high-speed modem interface without the aid of the Tymnet Supervisor. Once this was tested and deployed, they were able to shut down the rest of the MCI/WorldCom portion of Tymnet and continue to support their EDI customers. These "islands" of Tymnet were still running 5 years later in 2008.

==== WorldCom bankruptcy ====
WorldCom executives were involved in a financial scandal resulting in the CEO, Bernie Ebbers, to be ousted and later charged with violations of federal statutes. This scandal sent the stock price down to 10 cents per share, and WorldCom filed for bankruptcy. It emerged from bankruptcy renamed as MCI several months later.

==== AT&T sold to SBC ====
On January 31, 2005, SBC Communications (SBC) announced that it would purchase AT&T Corp. for more than $16 billion. Shortly thereafter, the SBC name was changed to AT&T Inc. to distinguish itself from the original AT&T Corp.

==== MCI sold to Verizon ====
On February 14, 2005, Verizon agreed to acquire MCI, formerly WorldCom, after SBC agreed to acquire AT&T Corp. just a few weeks earlier.

Verizon was formed in 2000 when Bell Atlantic, one of the Regional Bell Operating Companies, merged with GTE. Prior to its transformation into Verizon, Bell Atlantic had merged with another Regional Bell Operating Company, NYNEX, in 1997.

== Tymshare SUPER BASIC ==
SUPER BASIC was a compile and go implementation of a variant of the BASIC programming language for the Scientific Data Systems SDS 940 time-sharing computer system, commercialized by Tymshare around 1968.

== Tymshare PDP-10 compatible computers ==
Tymshare attempted marketing a line of computer developed by Foonly, using the name Tymshare XX Series Computer Family, of which the Tymshare System XXVI was the main focus. The Foonly F4 was remarketed as the System 26KL (another name for the Tymshare System XXVI).
