= Aloha Partners =

American telecommunications company

- Founded: 2000
- Headquarters: Providence, RI
- Key people: Scott Wills
- Parent: AT&T

Aloha Partners LP is a telecommunications company based in Providence, RI. It is the largest owner of 700 MHz spectrum in the United States.

== History ==
Aloha Partners LP is and was the largest buyer of spectrum in the FCC auctions of radio frequencies in the 700 MHz band in 2001 and 2003. Since that time, Aloha has also acquired the second largest (Cavalier Group LLC) and third largest (DataCom Wireless LLC) owners of 700 MHz spectrum. As a result, Aloha currently owns 12 MHz of spectrum covering 60% of the United States - including all the top 10 markets and 84% of the population in the top 40 markets.

On September 19, 2007, Aloha Partners announced that it had reached an agreement with LIN Television Corp. to purchase their entire catalog of 31 spectrum licenses in the 700 MHz band.

On February 4, 2008, the FCC approved the $2.5 billion buyout of Aloha Partners by AT&T Mobility. This gives AT&T control of former television channel 54 and 59 in a coverage area which includes 72 of the top 100 metropolitan areas and a grand total of 196 million people in 281 markets.

The next-largest owner of 700 MHz spectrum is Qualcomm, which owns channel 55 nationwide for use by its MediaFLO system.
