= BASIC-11 =

- Developer(s): Digital Equipment Corporation (DEC)
- Initial release: September 1976; 48 years ago
- Type: Programming language

BASIC-11 was a dialect of the basic language for PDP-11 operating systems such as RSX-11, RT-11, TSX and TSX-Plus. It was a classic BASIC in that it used line numbers, supported line number editing, and classic function syntax. It provided extended support for user-defined functions, external sequential disk files, and linking with assembler language modules for device support and operating system interfaces.
