= Core common area =

The core common area is that area of a computer program wherein data can remain between the end of execution of one program and the start of execution of a subsequent program using chainloading or in a pipeline.

Named after magnetic core memory, the term has persisted into the modern era and is commonly used by both the Fortran and BASIC languages.

== See also ==
- Chain loading
