= Concert Communications Services =

Joint business venture in Portugal

- Type: Joint venture
- Industry: Telecommunications
- Founded: June 1994; 32 years ago
- Defunct: 2002
- Fate: Dissolved
- Headquarters: Reston, Virginia, United States
- Area served: Global
- Key people: David Dorman (CEO)
- Products: Global telecommunication Network
- Owner: BT Group and MCI Communications (1994); Portugal Telecom (1997); BT Group and AT&T (1997–1999); AT&T and BT Group (2001–2002)
- Number of employees: approximately 1,000 people worldwide

Concert Communications Services was a $1 billion joint venture, originally launched in June 1994 by BT Group and MCI Communications. Portugal Telecom became a partner in 1997.

Concert was the first multiservice global end-to-end telecommunications provider, which broke the global national telecom monopoly on both international and in-country services. Its aim was to provide single deliverer end-to-end connectivity to multinational corporations. Its speed of global service coverage and availability was gained by leasing bandwidth from national telecoms companies, unlike competitors like FLAG or Global Crossing who physically laid cables in oceans, roads and pavements.

After the breakdown of the BT/MCI relationship, it became a joint venture between BT and AT&T in 1999. After BT and AT&T's relationship broke down in 2001, Concert's assets were split between the two parties and merged into their regional operations in 2002.

== Business need for Concert ==
In 1992, Sir Iain Vallance's SCOOP project in BT (later called Project Sovereign), objective was to rid the organisation of its Civil Service culture, and create a strategy to develop to create a global-level competitive group. This needed two deliverables in the business plan:

- UK based "the customer is King" approach, with a structure focused on specific market sectors
- global carrier level services, which removed the problem of B-end delivery by owning the whole route. At the time, international telecommunications services were based on agreements between national telecommunication providers wholly "owning" their countries territory.

Concert was developed to address the second deliverable — the conductor of global business. It was recognised in the strategy for Concert, that the organisation (i.e. - BT and Concert combined) could not own the world - nor would it want to, as some markets may be key to certain customers, but not to the overall strategy. Secondly, the regulation of global communications was broken down into national, regional, and global based regulators — to address them all would be highly complex, but most importantly slow rollout speed of the service. Resultantly, Concert had to be seen to be an independent organisation of its founder BT.

It was decided to locate Concert's global HQ in North America, the largest global telecommunications market. Reston, Virginia was chosen as it was both easily accessible from Europe, and sat in the then developing telecommunications and technology corridor of Northern Virginia. Concert started building its Global network in 1993; unlike its competitors FLAG and COLT, who physically built their network using their own assets, Concert grew rapidly by purchasing capacity from other TelCo's.

== Concert with MCI ==
In June 1994 BT and MCI (who had been talking to European rivals France Telecom and Deutsche Telekom about the same idea), launched Concert Communications Services, a $1 billion joint venture between the two companies. MCI had been in trouble for a while and needed cash - while BT needed a partner for Concert and access to the North American market: BT resultantly bought 20% of MCI to secure the deal, and inject the needed cash.

Concert's aim was to build a network which would provide easy global connectivity to multinational corporations. A series of Concert products were announced, which were based on Concert's global delivery platform, to fulfill its stated mission to develop a portfolio of enhanced telecommunication services targeted at multinational corporations. These services were available to purchase from both the owners, plus a series of partners who signed in to the Concert global platform around the world. Concert's portfolio of services included:

- Global virtual network services — voice, switched data, and conferencing
- Global managed data services — low and high speed packet switching and frame relay as well as pre-provisioned, managed, and flexible bandwidth services. These services included the integration of the former Tymnet network
- Global application services — messaging, electronic data interchange, e-mail, and videoconferencing
- Customer management services — network management outsourcing

According to Concert, by August 1995 Concert products encompassed approximately $700 million contracts with 2,000 customers in 40 countries and 800 cities.

The problem with the Concert arrangement was that, to overcome regulation, the three companies (BT, Concert, and MCI) were separate. For instance, each had its own board, sales force, operations team, and billing engine. This made delivering truly global deals virtually impossible — the only Customer Managed Service that progressed to delivery was with Dow Chemical.

=== Concert plc ===
This alliance progressed further on 3 November 1996 when the two companies announcement that they had entered into a full merger agreement to create a global telecommunications company to be called Concert plc, which would be incorporated in the UK with headquarters in both London and Washington DC.

Portugal Telecom (PT) also joined the alliance in 1997, but it didn't buy any share on Concert: it would only be the distributor of Concert services in Portugal. BT and MCI bought, respectively, 1% and 0.5% of PT.

The merger proposition gained approval from the European Commission, the US Department of Justice and the US Federal Communications Commission and looked set to proceed. However, after BT reduced its offer for MCI allowing it to talk to other suitors, on 1 October 1997 Worldcom made a rival bid for MCI which was followed by a counter bid from GTE. MCI accepted the Worldcom bid and BT pulled out of its deal with a severance fee of $465 million. BT made even more money when it sold its stake in MCI to Worldcom in 1998 for £4.15bn on which it made an exceptional pre-tax profit of £1.13bn. As part of the deal, BT bought from MCI its 24.9 per cent interest in Concert Communications, making Concert a wholly owned part of BT.

== Concert with AT&T ==
As BT now owned Concert, and still wanted access to the North American market, it needed a new partner.

An AT&T/BT option had been mooted in the past, but stopped on regulatory grounds due to their individual virtual monopolies in their home markets. By 1996, this had receded to the point where a deal was possible. However, the former monopolies clashed in management and culture - and the alliance never really worked from the start. Also, during the proposed MCI merger position, BT/MCI had placed a series of nominated customers inside Concert to overcome regulatory issues, leaving Concert with a sales force. On merger with AT&T, it was reversion to delivery of a series of Global products, and two competing owners - which robbed Concert of revenues and left its management disillusioned.

At its height, the Concert managed network directly reached more than 800 cities in 52 countries, and interlinked to about 240 other networks to extend access to 1,300 cities in 130 countries. Although Concert continued signing customers, its rate of revenue growth slowed, so that in 1999 David Dorman was made CEO with a brief to revive it.

In late 2000 the BT and AT&T boards fell-out - partly due to each partner's excess debt and the resultant board room clear-out(s); partly due to Concerts $800M annual losses. AT&T recognised that Concert was a threat to its ambitions if left intact, and so negotiated a deal where Concert was split in two in 2001: North America and Eastern Asia went to AT&T, the rest of the world and $400M to BT.

BT's remaining Concert assets were merged into its BT Ignite, later BT Global Services group.
