= ATAT =

ATAT, Atat, or variation, may refer to:

== People ==
- Ali El Atat (born 1984) Lebanese soccer player
- Nader Al Atat (born 1987) Lebanese singer

== Entertainment ==
- AT-AT (All Terrain Armored Transport), a 4-legged type Imperial Walker, from the Star Wars universe
- ATAT, a fictional defense contractor from Strike Back, see List of Strike Back characters
- Atat (song), a 2003 song by the Filipino rock band Rivermaya

== Other uses ==
- Alpha-tubulin N-acetyltransferase, an enzyme
- A common spelling for AT&T, a telecommunications company

== See also ==
- AT (disambiguation)
- AT&T (disambiguation)
