= ATT =

ATT may refer to:

== Telecommunications and computing ==
- AT&T (disambiguation)
  - AT&T Inc., an American telecommunications company founded 1983 (formerly Southwestern Bell or SBC Communications)
  - AT&T Corporation, the original AT&T founded 1885 (formerly American Telephone & Telegraph), purchased by SBC in 2005
  - AT&T Mobility, a subsidiary of AT&T Inc. for wireless services
  - AT&T Mexico, an international wireless subsidiary of AT&T Inc
- ATI Tray Tools - freeware program developed by Ray Adams for ATI Radeon video cards

== Transportation and government ==
- Attitude, in dynamics (aircraft attitude)
- Aircraft Transport and Travel, a 1910s British airline
- Atmautluak Airport, an airport in Alaska (IATA: ATT)
- Attadale railway station, United Kingdom (National Rail code)
- American Tobacco Trail
- Authorization to transport, a permit issued in Canada to transport Restricted and Prohibited firearms
- Arms Trade Treaty, a 2014 multilateral treaty to control the illicit trade of conventional weapons
- Amadou Toumani Touré, president of Mali

== Legal professionals ==
- Attorney at law
- Association of Taxation Technicians, a United Kingdom professional association

== Biology ==
- Attachment, the binding of a virus to its target cell
- ATT, a codon for the amino acid isoleucine

== Music ==
- A.T.T., a British dance music act
- Hamdan ATT (1946–2025), Indonesian dangdut singer

== Other uses ==
- Academy Transformation Trust, a multi-academy trust in England
- American Top Team, a mixed martial arts team based in Coconut Creek, Florida
