= Omega Drivers =

- Type: Private Company
- Founded: 2004
- Defunct: 2012
- Headquarters: Puerto Rico
- Key people: Angel Trinidad
- Website: www.omegadrivers.net

Omega Drivers were unofficial, third-party device drivers for ATI and NVIDIA graphics cards, created by Angel Trinidad. They differed from the official drivers in that they offer more customization and extra features. They are compatible with some ATI graphics cards and some NVIDIA cards that use Detonator drivers.

The drivers are tweaked versions of those officially released by ATI and NVIDIA, mainly using registry tweaks and offering an alternative installer. They are not custom drivers compiled from source code.

From the website:

The purpose of the Omega Drivers is to provide gamers with an alternate set of drivers, ones that have more options and features than the original sets. The drivers contain optimizations, extra features (like OC capabilities), more resolutions and internal tweaks that can give them the edge in a gaming environment over the normal drivers, which are often tailored for synthetic benchmarks. All Omega driver sets are tested (unless noted) by myself in my own PC or in an alternate PC (in the case of the NVIDIA drivers) to ensure maximum compatibility and reliability.

== ATI driver features ==
The Omega ATI driver is based on ATI's Catalyst drivers. The driver is particularly notable for resolving 3D compatibility problems affecting past versions of the ATI drivers (versions 7.8-7.12) and some AGP cards.

The driver includes various third-party utilities including 'MultiRes' (from EnTech Taiwan) and ATI Tray Tools tweaking utility.

== Reception ==
The drivers are recognized by ATI as the best alternative drivers on the Internet according to Terry Makedon:

"ATI supports the enthusiast community wholly. Omega Drivers are in fact a good example of ATI’s user community at its best. What they are in principle are CATALYST drivers with different settings enabled via registry keys and other such methods. This provides users an alternative to ATI’s CATALYST default settings. While there are a few different modification drivers out in the community our relationship with the creator of the Omega Drivers is of the highest working standard. The author of these drivers is part of the CATALYST beta driver testing team, and also in direct contact with ATI. In fact we would go so far as to say that if a user chooses to go the mod driver route, they go with the Omega Drivers."

NVIDIA has previously attempted legal action against some versions of Omega Drivers; the company has since allowed Omega Drivers for NVIDIA cards to be made.

== Branding ==
In 2014 AMD began offering an "upgraded" driver known as the Catalyst Omega driver. AMD claimed that the change in brand was due to the significant feature additions. Omega Drivers noted it was not affiliated with this AMD-distributed Catalyst Omega driver.
