= AT&T (disambiguation) =

AT&T, Inc., formerly known as Southwestern Bell Corporation (SBC), is an American telecommunications company.

AT&T may also refer to:

== Telecommunications ==
- AT&T Corporation, the original AT&T founded 1885 (formerly American Telephone & Telegraph), purchased by SBC in 2005
  - AT&T Communications Inc., provided long-distance services for AT&T Corporation (defunct)
  - AT&T Information Systems, founded 1982 (formerly American Bell), an unregulated business subsidiary of AT&T Corp.
  - Alascom dba AT&T Alascom, founded 1900 (formerly Washington-Alaska Military Cable and Telegraph System), a long-distance company
- AT&T Bell Laboratories, a former research & development subsidiary of AT&T
- AT&T Labs, founded 1988 (formerly Southwestern Bell Technology Resources), the R&D division of AT&T Inc.
  - AT&T Laboratories, founded 1925 as part of Bell Labs and AT&T Corp., later spun off and now absorbed into AT&T Labs
- AT&T Communications (formerly AT&T Long Lines), an operating company serving the regions of the Bell Operating Companies
  - AT&T CallVantage, a voice-over-internet-protocol service formerly offered by AT&T Corp. and then AT&T Inc.
- AT&T Mobility, the wireless provider subsidiary of AT&T Inc. (formerly Cingular Wireless)
  - AT&T Wireless Services, the former wireless provider subsidiary that became part of Cingular Wireless
- AT&T Technologies, founded 1983, a telephone producer, the postdivestiture successor to Western Electric
- AT&T Broadband, founded 1999 (now part of Comcast), once the largest U.S. provider of cable television services
- Advanced American Telephones, founded 1983, a manufacturer of AT&T branded phones (formerly AT&T Consumer Products)
- Bell Labs, founded 1925 (formerly also called Bell Telephone Laboratories, Inc., and later AT&T Bell Laboratories), a Nobel Prize–winning research and development organization
- Lucent, founded 1983 (now part of Alcatel-Lucent), the primary successor to Bell Labs and AT&T Technologies

== Locations ==
- AT&T Building (disambiguation), the name of several buildings
- One AT&T Plaza, or Whitacre Tower, headquarters of AT&T Inc.
- AT&T Stadium, Dallas
- Jones AT&T Stadium, Lubbock, Texas
- AT&T Park, San Francisco
- AT&T Field, Chattanooga, Tennessee

== Other ==
- AT&T syntax, assembly language syntax
- Aircraft Transport and Travel, a 1910s British airline

== See also ==
- History of AT&T
- AT&T breakup
