= Nader Al Atat =

Lebanese singer

Nader Al Atat نادر الأتات
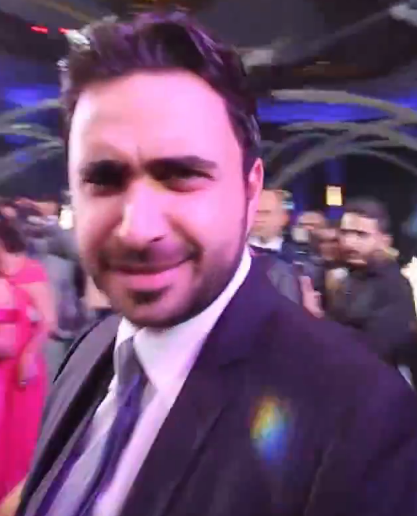

Background information
- Born: Nader Al Atat; August 21, 1987 (age 38)
- Origin: Shmustar, Lebanon
- Genres: Lebanese Music
- Occupation: Singer
- Years active: 2010–present
- Label: Art line

Nader Al Atat (born August 21, 1987) (Arabic: نادر الأتات) is a Lebanese singer. Al Atat's musical career started after winning Studio Al Fan, a TV program for young artists, at the age of 16. In 2005, he participated in Arabic television show Super Star, based on the popular British show Pop Idol.

== Biography ==
=== Early life ===
Nader Al Atat was born in Shmustar, Bekaa, he began his artistic career through the Super Star at its second session. He was 16 years old and was considered by the committee to be a special case among his peers. He inherited "Halawa" voice from his father and after the stage of Super Star presented his first single song entitled "Annie and Voet" from the words of Munir Bou Assaf and composed by Waseem Bustani. The song was a great success, and then the song "I wished" by the words of Mounir Bou Assaf and composed by Hisham Boulos, "Her Work and Mehla" lyrics by Hussein Ismail and composed by Wissam Al Amir. His talent was adopted by the artist Asi El-Hellani, who gave him the song "Mert Habibi" from the lyrics and lyrics of Munir Bou Assaf and "Post Tiyabak" lyrics and melody by Salim Assaf. He was named "Best Young Star" by a public vote by a Lebanese radio station.

=== Rumor of marriage ===
The story of his marriage to Lebanese lawyer "Jumana Queiroz", who lives in the United States in 2013, was widely denied.

== Discography ==
=== Singles ===
- 2015 : Ya Mohra
- 2015 : Khams Hawasy
- 2016 : Ma Bstslem
- 2017 : Qalby Aleamen
