= AT&T Communications (1984–2010) =

American telecommunications company

AT&T Communications, Inc.

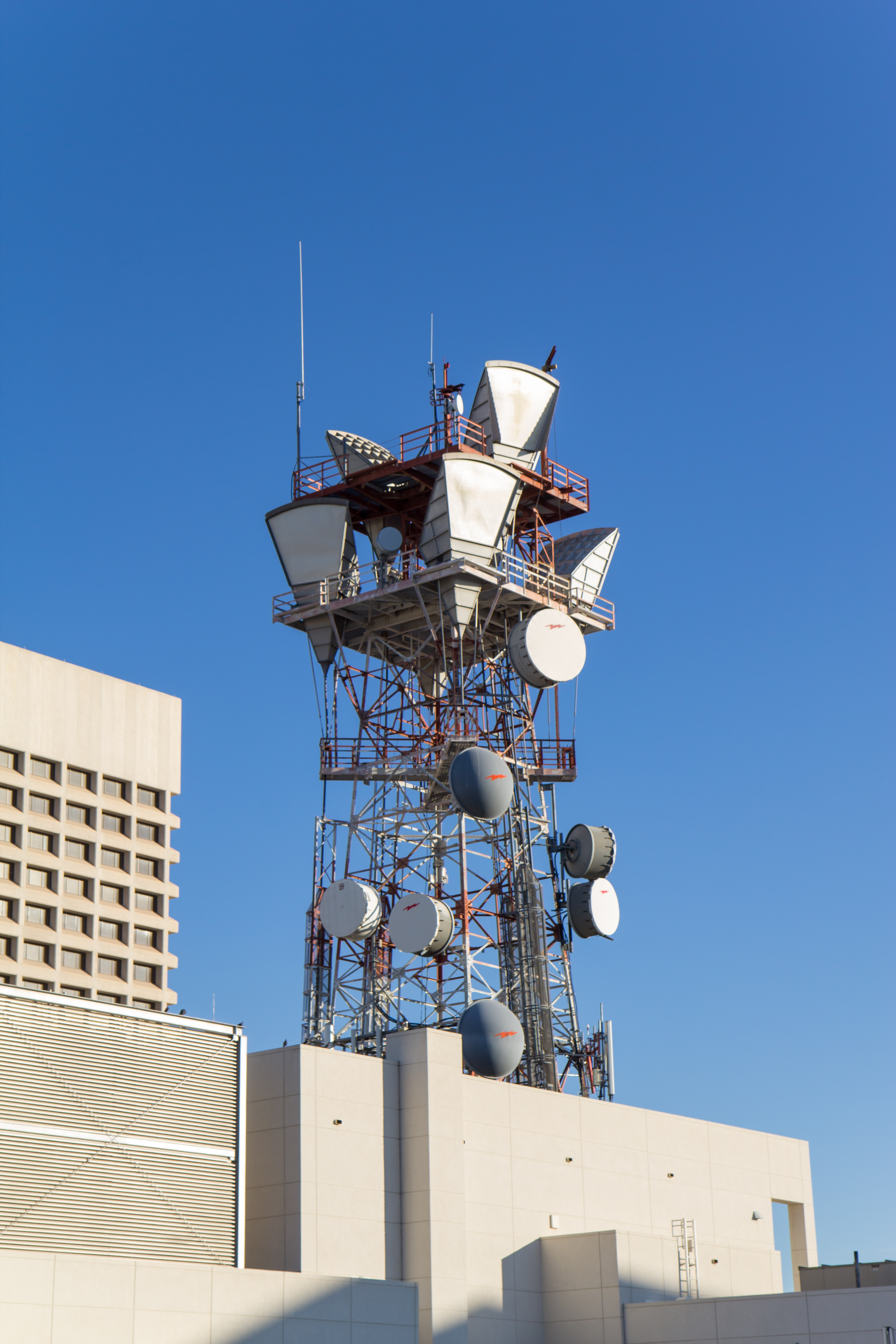
- An AT&T Long Lines tower in Phoenix, Arizona
- Type: Subsidiary
- Industry: Telecommunications
- Predecessor: American Telephone and Telegraph Company
- Founded: 1984; 42 years ago
- Defunct: 2010; 16 years ago
- Fate: Merged Into The AT&T Corporation
- Successor: AT&T Communications
- Headquarters: Bedminster, New Jersey, United States
- Products: Long distance
- Parent: AT&T Corporation (1984–2005); AT&T Inc. (2005–2010)
- Website: www.att.com

AT&T Communications, Inc. was a division of the AT&T Corporation that, through 23 subsidiaries, provided interexchange carrier and long-distance telephone services.

== History ==
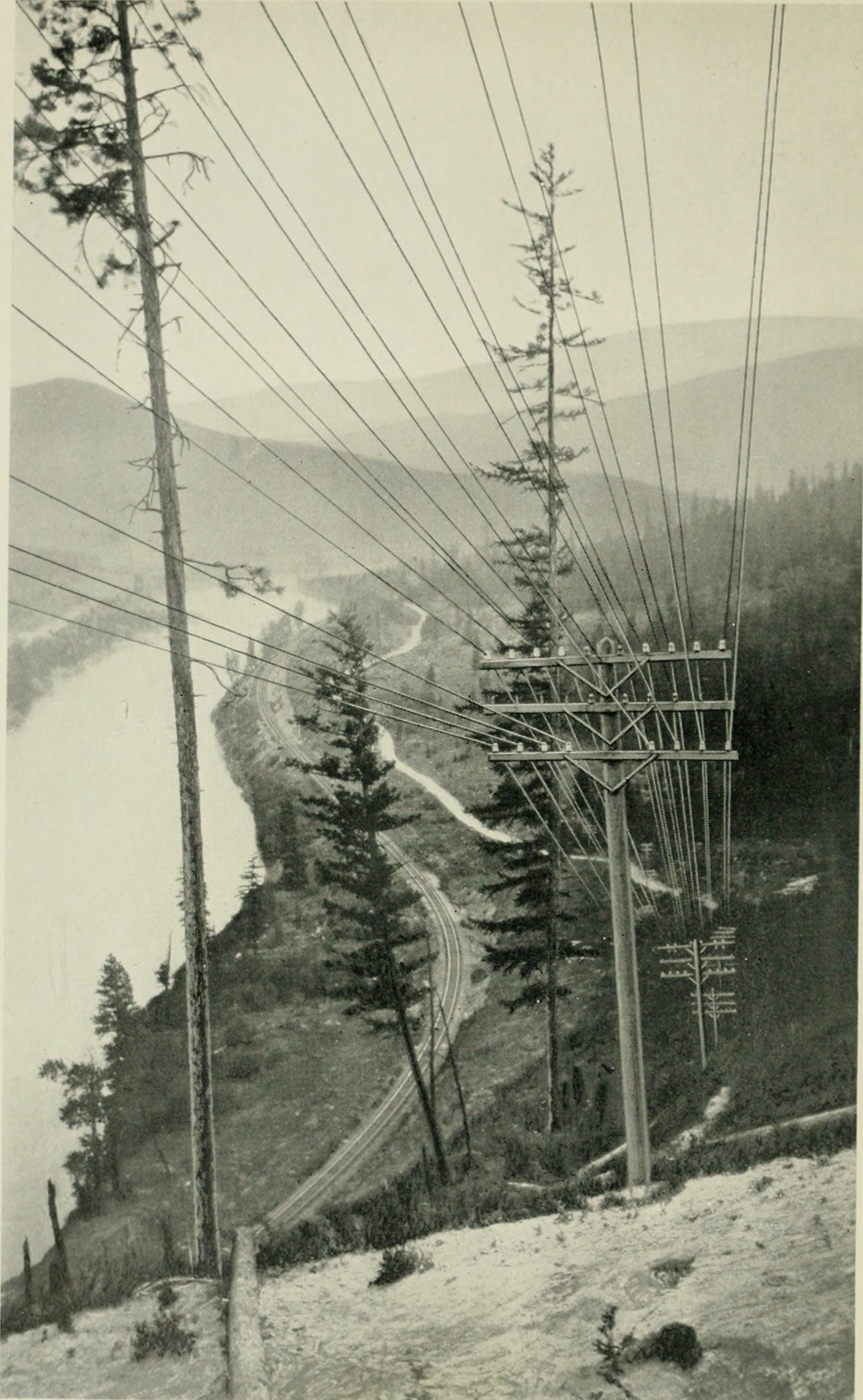
Line through western Montana, 1934

=== AT&T Long Lines Division ===
AT&T Long Lines was concerned with distance communications in the Bell System and used multiple mediums to provide distance communication such as by wire, cable, microwave radio relay and satellite communications that were used in conjunction to provide long-distance services for the Bell Telephone Companies and the Independent Telephone Companies. International Telephone connections to other countries used the networks which the Long Lines Division built and also provided supervision of those international connections. Originally, when AT&T was a division of The American Bell Telephone Company, (long) distance communications was the reason for the division being founded and led by Theodore N. Vail. On 30 December 1899, AT&T became the parent of the associated companies of the Bell System, when it acquired the assets of its parent company, The American Bell Telephone Company. This led to the Long Lines Division being founded to serve (long) distance communications.

=== Open wire and carrier systems ===
Before the introduction of coaxial cable and microwave relay systems, AT&T relied primarily on open-wire lines for long-distance telephone service. Early long-distance circuits required large copper conductors and loading coils to reduce attenuation over long distances. The development of vacuum-tube repeaters after 1914 allowed telephone circuits to extend across North America, culminating in the opening of transcontinental telephone service between New York and San Francisco in 1915.

Underground cable systems were increasingly used in cities and dense traffic corridors, where open-wire construction was impractical. However, the higher capacitance of cable caused substantially greater attenuation than open-wire lines, limiting its use on long-distance circuits until improvements in loading and amplification became available.

To reduce the cost of long-distance transmission, AT&T developed multiplexing techniques that increased the number of circuits carried on a single line. Early systems used phantom circuits to derive additional circuits from existing wire pairs. In the 1920s, AT&T adopted carrier telephony systems using frequency-division multiplexing to carry multiple telephone channels on a single pair of wires. Carrier systems were first deployed on open-wire routes and later expanded to coaxial cable systems carrying hundreds or thousands of simultaneous calls.

After World War II, microwave relay systems increasingly supplemented and replaced long-distance open-wire and coaxial cable routes.

=== Microwave relay network ===
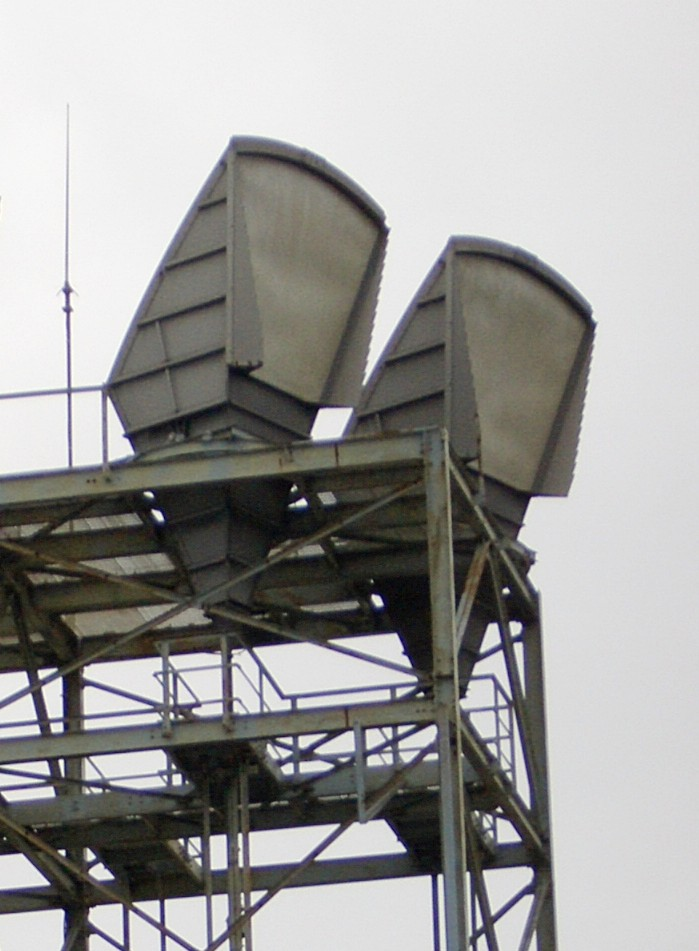
Horn reflector antennas on AT&T Long Lines microwave relay station, Seattle, Washington

With improved klystrons and other microwave devices devised during World War II, higher frequencies allowed far more channels on a given link. This allowed a single microwave relay to carry thousands of telephone calls. Bell Labs developed a practical system known as TD-2, produced by Western Electric. The system was designed not only to carry telephone calls, but also television signals, allowing programs to be sent from city to city. Microwaves are line of sight technology, so building such a network required towers built in strings between the endpoints, but this was still much less expensive than stringing the equivalent number of cables between the two points. The first complete system was installed between New York and Chicago and opened on September 1, 1950.

Given the cold war period in which the microwave relay system was designed, the AT&T Long Lines network was engineered to survive a nuclear attack. The reasoning for this was because the system carried military communications and data, in addition to the normal traffic from the public and corporations. The sites were hardened through the use of tough concrete buildings and in some cases, bunkers. Each base station typically contained a diesel generator, air filtration system, and toiletries common to fallout shelters of the day. All of this equipment was manufactured by Western Electric. The buildings typically had no windows, but featured louvers to allow for ventilation and cooling for the electronics housed inside. Many base stations were shielded from EMP blasts, and the system was designed with automatic routing which would automatically avoid towers that were knocked out in an attack or other outage. One famous example of a hardened AT&T Long Lines site is 33 Thomas Street in Manhattan, it was designed to withstand a nuclear blast and has no windows.

Formal opening of the United States coast-to-coast connection was on August 17, 1951, via AT&T's network control center in New York City. A presidential address from Harry Truman at the San Francisco Peace Conference on September 4, 1951 opened the network, demonstrating coast-to-coast television service. The first regularly scheduled show to use this was Edward R. Murrow's See It Now on November 18, 1951. Later, the network allowed events such as American Bandstand and ABC's Monday Night Football to be broadcast live nationally and permitted distribution of regional sports events, such as Saturday football games prior to the adoption of satellite communications in the 1970s.

Long Lines briefly published a periodical, TWX, targeted to companies that used AT&T's equipment and services, particularly TeletypeWriter eXchange, from which it took its name. The periodical was discontinued in 1952.

While coaxial links continued to connect major US cities, the primary links had moved to the microwave systems by the late 1960s.

By the 1980s, alternatives such as fiber optics and satellites supplemented and eventually replaced the microwave system.

=== Direct distance dialing ===
In 1950, New York City's five boroughs could be dialed directly by subscribers from various communities in New Jersey with the digits '1-1' followed by the seven-digit telephone number. While New York City received the area code 212 when AT&T formulated the first nationwide telephone numbering plan in October 1947, it wouldn't be until 1951 when Englewood, New Jersey, customers would dial their calls to New York City using the prefix 212, as well as other area codes to reach many cities in the nation. New York City's five boroughs also had been dialing northeastern New Jersey as 11+ the two letters and five digits of the New Jersey number.

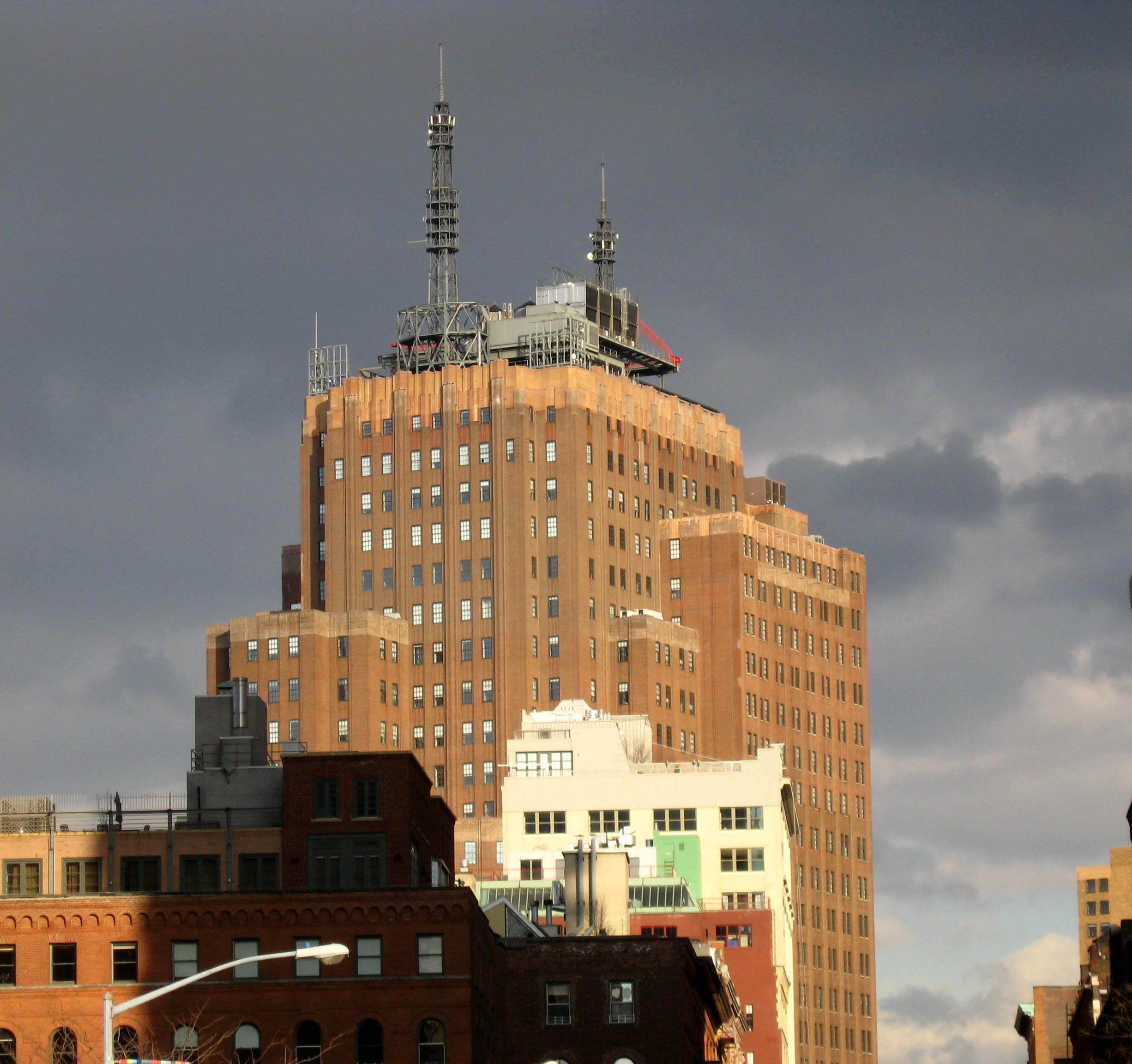
32 Avenue of the Americas, New York headquarters and principal switching center of AT&T Long Lines in mid 20th century; still used in 2008

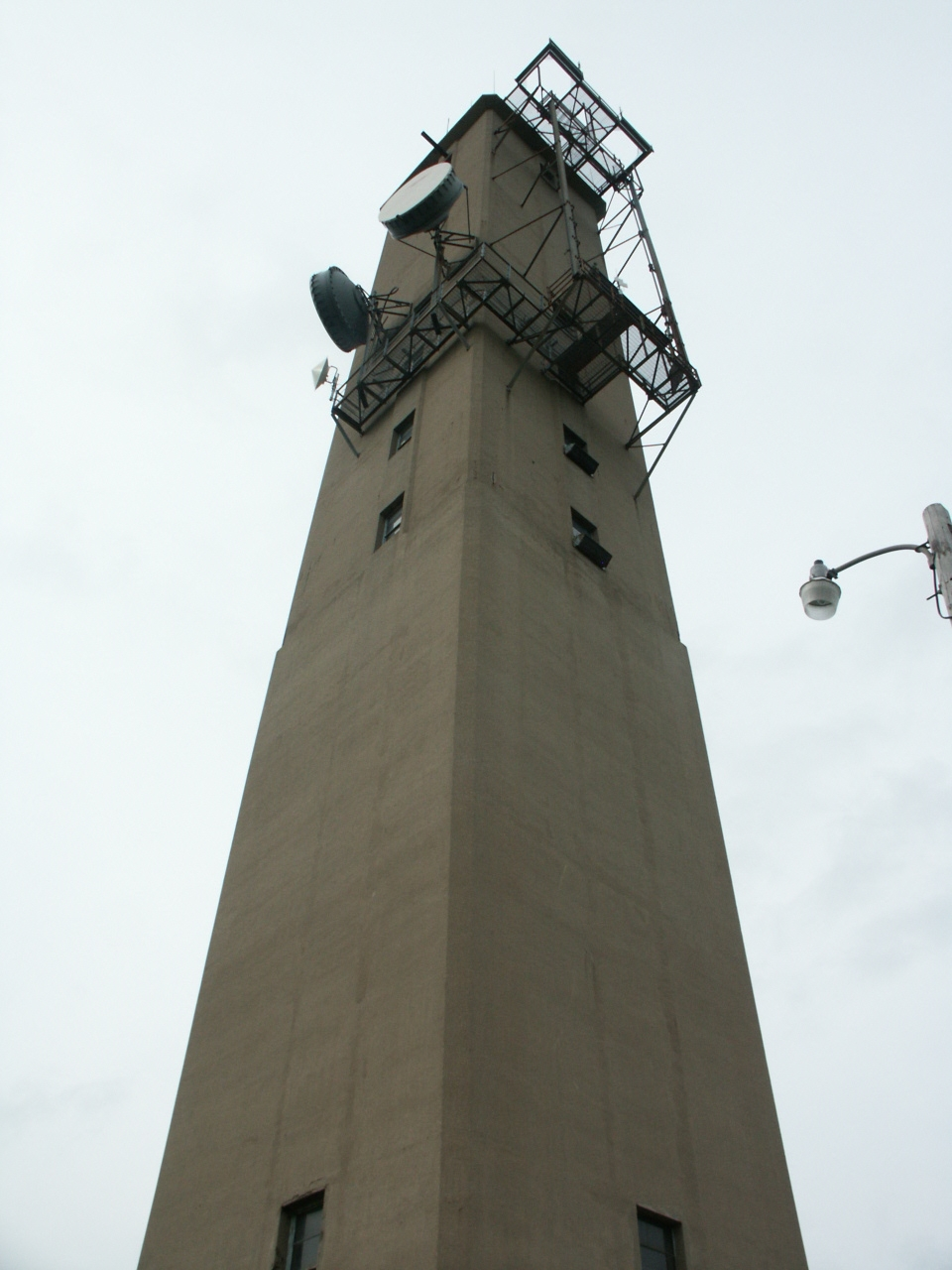
Long Lines relay tower in Indiana. Earlier stations in the microwave network used concrete towers due to the post-war price of steel as well as the desire to place the electronics closer to the antennas – they are in rooms behind the windows half way up the tower.

The use of area code 201 to call New Jersey from New York City only began later in the 1950s. Other cities in northeastern New Jersey were dialable in 1951 (and for a few years prior) from Englewood by simply dialing the two letters of the exchange name and remaining five digits. In addition to New York City, the Nassau County part of Long Island was dialable from Englewood and Teaneck using area code 516. Also Westchester County, Rockland County, and portions of Orange and Putnam Counties were also dialable from Englewood and Teaneck in 1951 using area code 914.

Early in the 20th century, the telephone companies organized a "Separations and Settlements" process by which Long Lines and the local companies divided the revenues of long-distance calls according to their respective costs. The mid-century advent of microwave and other high capacity systems dramatically cut the cost of long-haul operations, but pricing did not decline proportionally. Rather, the local fraction of revenue-sharing rose to subsidize local service.

=== AT&T Communications ===
AT&T Communications became one of the three core sales units of AT&T after reorganization of assets.

AT&T divided AT&T Communications into 22 operating companies, serving the regions of each Bell Operating Company that was spun off. Some of these companies are currently operating:

- AT&T Communications of Indiana, G.P.
- AT&T Communications of New York, Inc.
- AT&T Communications of Virginia, LLC
- AT&T Communications of Washington D.C., LLC

The other companies, which have been merged into AT&T Corp., included:

- AT&T Communications of California, Inc.
- AT&T Communications of Delaware, Inc.
- AT&T Communications of Illinois, Inc.
- AT&T Communications of Maryland, LLC
- AT&T Communications of Michigan, Inc.
- AT&T Communications of New England, Inc.
- AT&T Communications of Nevada, Inc.
- AT&T Communications of NJ, L.P.
- AT&T Communications of Ohio, Inc.
- AT&T Communications of Pennsylvania, LLC
- AT&T Communications of the Midwest, Inc.
- AT&T Communications of the Mountain States, Inc.
- AT&T Communications of the Pacific Northwest, Inc.
- AT&T Communications of the South Central States, LLC
- AT&T Communications of the Southern States, LLC
- AT&T Communications of the Southwest, Inc.
- AT&T Communications of West Virginia, Inc.
- AT&T Communications of Wisconsin, L.P.

Following the Telecommunications Act of 1996, AT&T Communications began reselling Bell Operating Company-provided telephone service at lower prices to compete with the Baby Bells. Their names were: Ameritech, Bell Atlantic, BellSouth, NYNEX, Pacific Telesis, Southwestern Bell, and US West. The advertising campaign which had a broad appeal was named AT&T CallVantage.

=== AT&T–SBC Communications merger ===
In 2005, SBC Communications purchased AT&T Corp., the parent company of AT&T Communications. SBC had already been offering its own long-distance services through SBC Long Distance LLC in its own territory in competition with other long-distance companies. As a result, AT&T Communications was refocused to seek new customers outside of the AT&T 13-state region served by its Bell Operating Companies.

In 2010, AT&T Communications (and subsidiary AT&T Communications of New England) was merged into AT&T Corp. In 2012, 17 more of the AT&T Communications companies were dissolved into AT&T Corp., leaving only the companies in Indiana, New York, Virginia, and Washington, D.C. as the last remnants of the 1984-created structure. On July 28, 2017, AT&T announced a new AT&T Communications corporate division, which will house AT&T Mobility, DirecTV, U-Verse, AT&T Business, and Technology and Operations Group.

== See also ==
- Long line (telecommunications)
- TD-2
