= AT&T Building =

AT&T Building, AT&T Field, AT&T Center, AT&T Park, AT&T Tower, or AT&T Stadium may refer to:

== Buildings owned or operated by AT&T ==
The following buildings are directly associated with AT&T or its predecessors or subsidiaries:

- AT&T City Center, Birmingham, Alabama
- AT&T Huron Road Building, Cleveland
- Whitacre Tower also known as One AT&T Plaza, Dallas
- AT&T Michigan Headquarters, Detroit
- AT&T 220 Building, Indianapolis
- AT&T Building (Indianapolis)
- AT&T Building (Kingman, Arizona)
- AT&T Switching Center, Los Angeles
- AT&T Tower (Minneapolis)
- AT&T Building (Nashville)
- AT&T Building (Omaha)
- AT&T Center (St. Louis)
- AT&T Building (San Diego)

=== Former ===
- 32 Avenue of the Americas, formerly AT&T Long Distance Building or AT&T Building, New York City
- 33 Thomas Street, formerly AT&T Long Lines Building, New York City
- 550 Madison Avenue, formerly AT&T Building, New York City
- 611 Place, formerly AT&T Center, Los Angeles
- Franklin Center (Chicago), formerly AT&T Corporate Center
- South Park Center (Los Angeles), formerly AT&T Center
- Tower Square, formerly AT&T Midtown Center, Atlanta, Georgia
- TIAA Bank Center, formerly AT&T Tower, Jacksonville, Florida

== AT&T naming rights ==
The following are not directly owned or operated by AT&T, but are named for the company as the result of a naming rights purchase.

- AT&T Stadium, Arlington, Texas
- AT&T Field, Chattanooga, Tennessee
- AT&T Performing Arts Center, Dallas

=== Former ===
- Frost Bank Center, formerly AT&T Center, San Antonio, Texas
- Jones Stadium, formerly Jones AT&T Stadium, Lubbock, Texas
- NRG Station, formerly AT&T Station, Philadelphia
- Oracle Park, formerly AT&T Park, San Francisco
