= Shmustar =

Town in Baalbek-Hermel, Lebanon

Shmustar شمسطار
- Shmustar
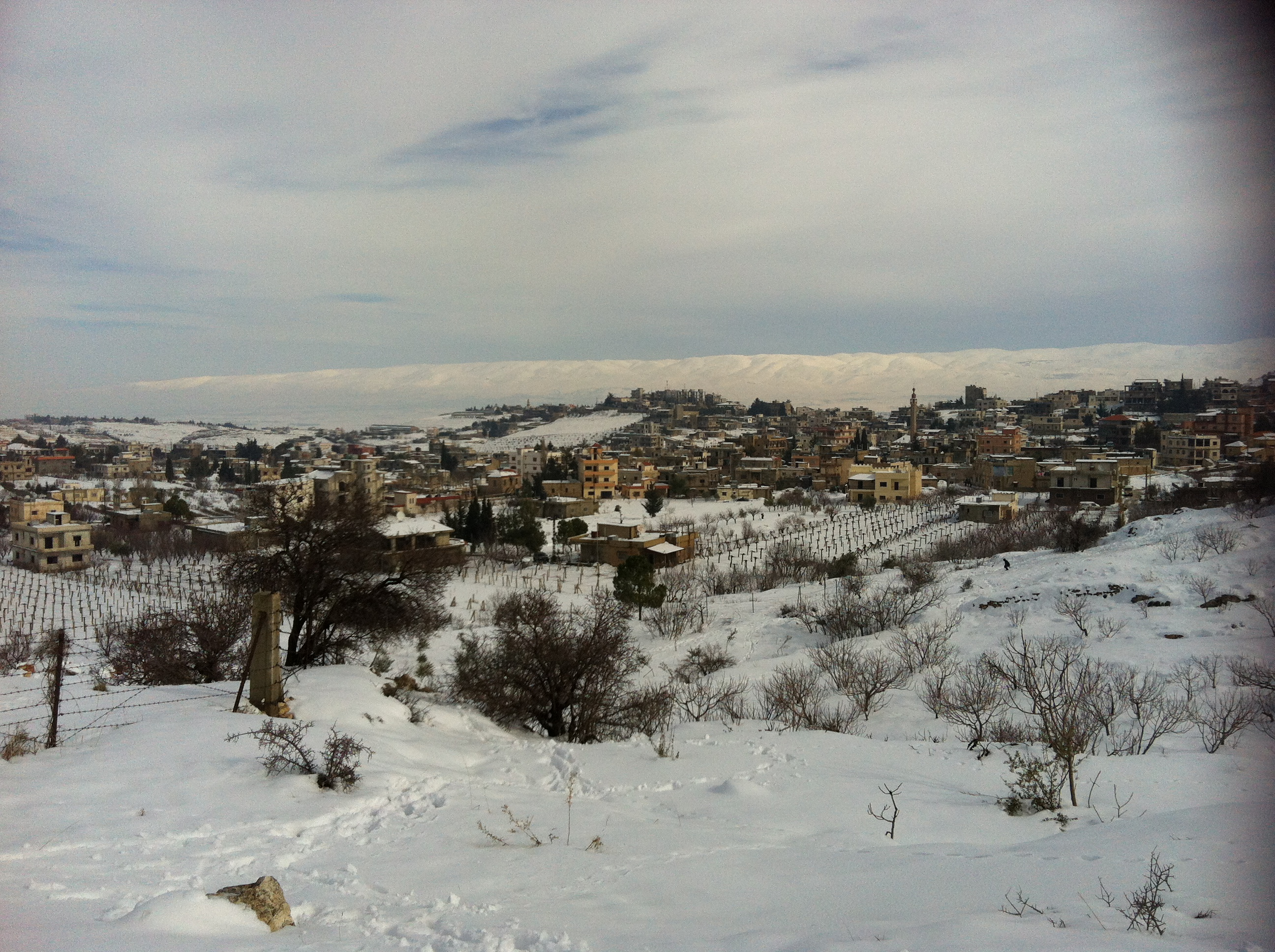
- Shmustar

- Location in Lebanon
- Coordinates: 33°58′N 36°1′E
- Country: Lebanon
- Governorate: Baalbek-Hermel
- District: Baalbek

Government

Area
  - Total: 18 km^{2} (6.9 sq mi)
- Elevation: 1,250 m (4,100 ft)

Population (2012)
  - Total: 30,000
- Time zone: UTC+2 (EST)
  - Summer (DST): +3
- Area code: 9618

Shmustar, also spelled Shmistar or Chmistar (Arabic: شمسطار) is a Lebanese town located in Baalbek-Hermel Governorate, Lebanon between Baalbeck and Zahleh, on the eastern slope of Mount Sannine. It overlooks the Bekaa Valley from an altitude of 1,250 metres (4,100 ft) above sea level. The town is 75 km (47 mi) from Beirut and 21 km (13 mi) from Baalbek. Chmistar has a population of 30,000 according to a 2012 census.

== Demographics ==
In 2014 Muslims made up 99.28% of registered voters in Shmustar. 97.02% of the voters were Shiite Muslims. The number of voters in 2014 was 12,881.

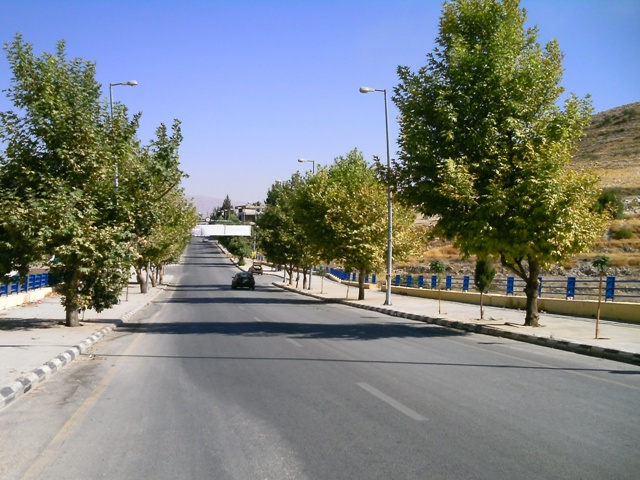
Main road
