= List of Strike Back characters =

Strike Back is a British/American action and military television series, based on a novel of the same name by novelist and former Special Air Service soldier Chris Ryan. The series follows the actions of Section 20, a secretive branch of the British Defence Intelligence service, who operate several high risk, priority missions throughout the globe. The series began broadcasting on Sky1 on 5 May 2010, showing the first six-part series. After a second series was commissioned, it was announced that Cinemax would co-produce the franchise. The first episode of the ten-part second series, under the banner title Project Dawn in the United Kingdom, first aired on Cinemax on 12 August 2011. The ten-part third series, under the title Strike Back: Vengeance, began airing on Cinemax on 17 August 2012. On 3 October 2012, Cinemax and Sky commissioned a fourth series, which was broadcast on Cinemax beginning 9 August 2013. A ten-episode fifth and final season aired in 2015.

The following is a list of characters that have appeared on the television series.

== Section 20 ==
Character	Actor	Series appearances
John Porter	Richard Armitage	1–2
Richard Armitage John Porter is the main protagonist of the first series who is a Sergeant in the British SAS. In 2003 he took part in a botched operation to rescue Kenneth Bratton, a weapons contractor held hostage in Iraq on the eve of the American-led invasion, where two soldiers were killed and a third left in a persistent vegetative state. Porter was blamed as they suspected the killer was a 13-year-old hostile, As'ad, and Porter failed to kill him. As a result, he resigned a disgraced operator, he could not find suitable employment, and became estranged from his wife and daughter. Seven years later, he is drafted back into service to work for Section 20. He ultimately learns that the boy, was not the killer, but his new superior Hugh Collinson. In the second series, Project Dawn, Porter worked to capture terrorist Latif in Pakistan, who is planning the eponymous operation. Instead, Porter gets captured, and later executed. It is later revealed that Porter was exposed by Pakistani intelligence and to a lesser extent, Eleanor Grant, Collinson's successor. Armitage dropped out of the role after the first series to play Thorin Oakenshield in The Hobbit film trilogy.: First appearance: Series 1, Episode 1; Last appearance: Project Dawn, Episode 1
Hugh Collinson	Andrew Lincoln	1
Andrew Lincoln Major Hugh Collinson is the head of Section 20 in the first series. Collinson was a military intelligence officer who worked with Porter in the SAS mission to rescue Kenneth Bratton. When enemy re-enforcements arrived Collinson accidentally killed two SAS soldiers. However, Porter was given the blame. Later, Collinson is promoted to lead Section 20. In 2010, journalist Katie Dartmouth is kidnapped by terrorists in Iraq, among them is As'ad, who is the only witness to Collinson's shooting. Collinson covers his tracks by refusing to aid As'ad, likely leading to his death. The truth is later discovered by Layla, after the third soldier dies after seven-years in a coma, and ballistics evidence matches Collinson's gun. Collinson is later forced to help Porter in Afghanistan, after he sells the latter out by the American government to kill him. Collinson is shot several times by the Taliban while helping Porter escape, and in his dying moments uses a grenade to kill them.: First appearance: Series 1, Episode 1; Last appearance: Series 1, Episode 6
Danni Prendiville	Shelley Conn	1
Shelley Conn Danni Prendiville is an officer in Section 20. In the first series, Prendiville oversees Porter's training after he joins the unit, and then has sex with him. The two later have an affair. Her status since the end of the first series is unknown.: First appearance: Series 1, Episode 1; Last appearance: Series 1, Episode 6
Layla Thompson	Jodhi May	1
Layla Thompson is a Lieutenant in military intelligence and works alongside Collinson in Section 20. Throughout the first series her demeanor towards Porter's employment in the section changes. At first she comes to resent Porter, but as time goes by an opens up to him. She later becomes aware of the truth behind the botched 2003 operation and ultimately learns it was Collinson who killed the soldiers. She then confronts Collinson and blackmails him into aiding Porter in Afghanistan or she will report her findings to Collinson's superiors. Her status since the end of the first series is unknown.: First appearance: Series 1, Episode 1; Last appearance: Series 1, Episode 6
Michael Stonebridge	Philip Winchester	2–6
Philip Winchester Colour Sergeant Michael Stonebridge is one of the two series protagonists, alongside Damien Scott, from Project Dawn to Legacy. In the series, Stonebridge is a Royal Marine Commando turned SBS operator working for Section 20, and is married to his wife Kerry. Despite this, Stonebridge has an affair with Section 20 officer Kate Marshall. In Project Dawn, Stonebridge is assigned to collect Damien Scott to identify Latif, a mysterious terrorist. Their working relationship begins somewhat rocky due to the duo's polarising views on tactics. He ends his affair with Kate, but soon afterwards, Kate is killed in a bomb, and Stonebridge temporarily loses focus on his job. When Kerry announces she is pregnant, the wife pressures Stonebridge to leave Section 20. After foiling Latif's Project Dawn, Stonebridge decides to resign. In Vengeance, Stonebridge trains British special operation recruits, but during a live-ammunition training exercise, he is forced to kill a recruit when he breaks down and threatens the other recruits. He briefly rejoins Section 20 to rescue Scott in Somalia, but then rejoins full-time after the dead recruit's brother, Craig Hanson, avenges his death by killing Kerry. Stonebridge becomes fixated on killing Hanson, who is now working for Conrad Knox, the season's antagonist, and hence loses focus again. By the end of the series, Stonebridge fulfils his revenge, but decides to forgive Hanson also. In Shadow Warfare, he and Scott are ordered to capture Kamali, a lieutenant of elusive terrorist al-Zuhari, in Colombia, and kill Viktor Ulyanov of the Russian mafia in the process. This action results in a hit his and Scott's life as his father Arkady is a high-ranking mob boss. In the third episode, Stonebridge is unknowingly contaminated with a chemical weapon leaked from outdated missiles in a warehouse. As a result, he suffers episodes of impaired visions, affecting his combat abilities. He is not made aware of his condition until episode seven, where he has only days to live. He is later given the antidote and manages to survive to fight again, while also having the bounty lifted when Arkady is killed. During the events of Legacy, Stonebridge begins to seriously contemplate his life when he is forced to confront the idea that his government would consent to having him killed if it would fulfil a political end. He expresses the hope that he will die as a soldier because he has always been a soldier and has no identity outside it. After surviving pursuit by a CIA assassination squad, Stonebridge is officially the only survivor of Section 20. He faces an uncertain future as he tries to adjust to civilian life, but chooses to join Scott and his son on a road trip to Las Vegas. Stonebridge makes a guest appearance in Retribution, partnering with Scott to aid the reformed Section 20. Since the events of Legacy they have become "independent contractors" carrying out sensitive and dangerous intelligence operations on behalf of the British government, giving Whitehall plausible deniability.: First appearance: Project Dawn, Episode 1; Last appearance: Retribution, Episode 10
Damien Scott	Sullivan Stapleton	2–6
Sullivan Stapleton First Sergeant Damien Scott is one of the two series protagonists, alongside Michael Stonebridge, from Project Dawn to Legacy. Scott was a member of the US Army Rangers before joining Delta Force working to investigate possible weapons of mass destruction in Iraq. When he began questioning mysterious WMD intelligence, he found himself dishonorably discharged when two pounds of opium were planted in his possession. He was considered so unorthodox in his methods, that even private military companies would not hire him. He is first seen in Malaysia entering fighting contests for income. He is brought in by Section 20 to identify Latif, though Scott later admits he never actually saw him. Scott later becomes a member of Section 20. Throughout the series he realises that he was set up by Eleanor Grant as part of a mission to plant weapons in Iraq. He acquires the file that would exonerate him, but he decides to burn the file instead. In Vengeance Scott is captured while on a rescue mission in Somalia, but later rescued by Stonebridge. While working to recover four stolen nuclear triggers, he is reacquainted with Christy Bryant. It is revealed that after his dishonourable discharge, he and Christy worked together to kill numerous targets around the world that posed a threat to the United States, but stopped in 2005 when he killed the son of a target in a car bomb in Ecuador. By the end of the series, Scott reluctantly partners up with her once more to stop Conrad Knox from selling and detonating four nuclear weapons. In Shadow Warfare he and Stonebridge are wanted by the Russian mafia for killing the son of mob boss Arkady Ulyanov during a mission to capture Kamali. Over the course of the series, Scott learns that he fathered a son, Finn, from one of his past relationships while in the States. He acquires a bag of diamonds from one of the missions, and decides to give it to his son's mother Rebecca. By the end of the series, Scott begins a relationship with Julia Richmond. In Legacy, Finn finds himself in trouble at home and runs to Bangkok to meet his father. Initially believing Scott to be an IT consultant, the two are attacked by the Yakuza and Scott finds himself acting as a father for the first time. When he and Stonebridge infiltrate North Korea, Scott surrenders upon learning that the North Koreans have abducted Finn and even confesses to committing an act of war to protect him. Once the three escape North Korea, Scott begins contemplating life after Section 20 having previously admitted that he expects to die in action. When he and Stonebridge evade a CIA-sanctioned hit squad, Scott stages his own death, allowing him to return to the United States and be a father to Finn. Scott makes a guest appearance in Retribution, partnering with Stonebridge to aid the reformed Section 20. Since the events of Legacy they have become "independent contractors" carrying out sensitive and dangerous intelligence operations on behalf of the British government, giving Whitehall plausible deniability.: First appearance: Project Dawn, Episode 1; Last appearance: Retribution, Episode 10
Eleanor Grant	Amanda Mealing	2
Colonel Eleanor Grant is the head of Section 20 following the demise of Hugh Collinson, in Project Dawn. Her main assignment was to stop Latif, who killed Porter. She reluctantly takes in Scott as an operative. By the end of the series, it is revealed that she took part in "Operation Trojan Horse", a project to plant VX nerve gas in Iraq to prove the existence of weapons of mass destruction there. Though the operation was abandoned, she was ashamed of her actions (having indirectly caused the events of Project Dawn), and in her attempt to cover up her involvement, she framed Scott's possession charges and indirectly exposed Porter leading to his death. In the climax, Grant forces Latif to shoot an explosive canister under her jacket, killing Latif and herself. In Vengeance she would be replaced by Rachel Dalton as head of the section.: First appearance: Project Dawn, Episode 1; Last appearance: Project Dawn, Episode 10
Kate Marshall	Eva Birthistle	2
Eva Birthistle Captain Kate Marshall is a Section 20 officer in Project Dawn. Originally from Ireland, Marshall oversees the personnel in the section, as well as having an affair with Michael Stonebridge, which he later breaks off. In the fourth episode, Marshall is captured by Daniel Connolly, later revealed to be strapped with a bomb as insurance should he be captured. Connolly refuses to disarm the bomb, and Kate dies in the explosion.: First appearance: Project Dawn, Episode 1; Last appearance: Project Dawn, Episode 4
Oliver Sinclair	Rhashan Stone	2–3
Major Oliver Sinclair is Section 20's second-in-command, behind Grant in Project Dawn. In Vengeance, following Grant's death, Sinclair takes provisional command until Dalton is promoted. Though little is known about his personal life, he is revealed to have children in Vengeance. In the season's seventh episode he and the rest of Section 20 (sans Scott and Stonebridge) were arrested by corrupt South African officials and sent to a prison. Sinclair realises that the officials intend to kill them. Sinclair manages to warn the rest of his team before he is executed by mercenaries.: First appearance: Project Dawn, Episode 1; Last appearance: Vengeance, Episode 7
Julia Richmond	Michelle Lukes	2–5
Michelle Lukes Sergeant Julia Richmond is introduced in Project Dawn as one of the section's newest recruits. She begins the series mostly as a technical officer, but takes a more active role in the field beginning in Vengeance, starting by rescuing Scott from capture by Somalis with Stonebridge. Throughout the series, Scott attempts to flirt with her on numerous occasions. The two later become, and by the end of Shadow Warfare, they have sex and begin a relationship that lasts as of the beginning of Legacy. Richmond is shot and killed by Mei Foster in episode four of Legacy.: First appearance: Project Dawn, Episode 1; Last appearance: Legacy, Episode 4
Rachel Dalton	Rhona Mitra	3–4
Rhona Mitra Major Rachel Dalton (formerly Captain) is a military intelligence officer. She is introduced in Vengeance as "Rachel McMillan", junior attaché to British Diplomat Patrick Burton. She is later revealed to be undercover to intercept four nuclear triggers, which end up in the wrong hands. Whitehall later appoint her to command Section 20, replacing Grant, to hunt the nuclear triggers, which are later in the hands of philanthropist Conrad Knox. Due to Knox's influence with the South African government, Dalton has Section 20 go dark in order to stop him. By the end, she gets the co-operation with the South Africans again, and they work together to stop Knox. When the team succeed, Knox shoots Dalton, but she survives. In Shadow Warfare, Dalton becomes addicted to morphine, and begins to act more erratically. Her drug use would later result in her suspension by Philip Locke. Despite this she captures the wife of al-Zuhari and has her released so she could follow her to al-Zuhari. Instead, Dalton finds Mairead McKenna of the Real Irish Republican Army (IRA) and is shot to death. After her death it is revealed that Dalton had a son.: First appearance: Vengeance, Episode 1; Last appearance: Shadow Warfare, Episode 4
Liam Baxter	Liam Garrigan	3–4
Sergeant Liam Baxter is a field operative introduced in Vengeance, working for Rachel Dalton to find four nuclear triggers. In Shadow Warfare, he is working undercover as a journalist to find al-Zuhari, but is exposed and captured by the terrorists. He is swiflty executed by the terrorists when they realise his true identity. Dalton fails to save him as she is out of ammunition.: First appearance: Vengeance, Episode 1; Last appearance: Shadow Warfare, Episode 1
Philip Locke	Robson Green	4–5
Robson Green Colonel Philip Locke begins as an official in Whitehall. According to Stonebridge, Locke was an SAS legend who worked several missions against the IRA in the 1980s. At one point the IRA attempted to kill him with a car bomb, but instead the bomb killed his son and left his wife in a persistent vegetative state. The bomber was never caught. In Shadow Warfare, Locke suspends Dalton and effectively takes charge of Section 20 from then on. When the IRA are revealed to be working with al-Zuhari's cell, Locke is briefly held captive by them. After he is rescued, Locke later manages to capture Mairead McKenna and forces her to divulge the identity of the bomber. When McKenna instead tries to shoot him—but is killed by Kamali before she can—Locke is forced to accept that he will never find his son's killer. However, during the events of Legacy, he encounters a freelance bombmaker who he identifies as the man who called him moments before his son's death. The bombmaker, Desmond, claims that it was the British government and not the IRA who arranged for the bombing which was intended to kill Locke himself. Locke subsequently executes Desmond. Locke is later killed during a prisoner transfer when a CIA assassination squad ambush Section 20.: First appearance: Shadow Warfare, Episode 1; Last appearance: Legacy, Episode 9
Kim Martinez	Milauna Jackson	4–5
Kim Martinez is an American DEA Special Agent and former Marine. Stationed in Colombia, she is introduced in Shadow Warfare to aid Section 20 in capturing Kamali, after which she helps Section 20 for the rest of the season. In the finale she is infected with weaponised smallpox, but is given the vaccine before she started to display symptoms. She continues working for Section 20 in Legacy until she is recalled by the DEA. Martinez chooses to obey the order as she struggles with her guilt over Richmond's death.: First appearance: Shadow Warfare, Episode 1; Last appearance: Legacy, Episode 6
Thomas McAllister	Warren Brown	6–8
Sergeant Thomas "Mac" McAllister is one of the three series protagonists, alongside Samuel Wyatt and Gracie Novin, from Retribution to Vendetta. McAllister is a soldier in the UKSF who had a promising career until he assaulted a senior officer. The only survivor of a disastrous mission to render the terrorist Omair Idrisi, he was due to be court martialled for striking a senior officer until the revived Section 20 reassigned him. He is initially partnered with Wyatt, whom he initially finds to be irritating, but the two gradually develop camaraderie. McAllister is promoted to team leader in Revolution, much to Wyatt's amusement. He proves to be a capable leader but struggles to follow orders that clash with his sense of right and wrong. He is temporarily demoted when he deliberately defies a direct order and risks compromising the entire mission. During the events of Vendetta, Coltrane nominates MacAllister for officer training. He initially refuses until Coltrane points out that his career has few other options. Despite this, MacAllister has a crisis of conscience: he unwittingly detains and then the terrorist Zayef, defies orders and surrenders Zayef's brother Mahir to save his team, and believes he is responsible for the death of an Israeli police officer that he was cultivating as a source. When Zayef sets off a bomb in Münich, MacAllister pursues him alone and is shot in the neck. He dies despite Section 20's efforts to save him. He has an hallucination of an alternative life where he survived, retired and started a family. Struggling with post-traumatic stress disorder, he revisits an incident in Afghanistan where he had to accept the help of a Taliban sniper to survive. MacAllister realises that his willingness to follow his conscience rather than his orders is what made him a good soldier and he accepts his death. It is implied that his hallucination of life as a civilian becomes his afterlife.: First appearance: Retribution, Episode 1; Last appearance: Vendetta, Episode 6
Samuel Wyatt	Daniel MacPherson	6–8
Daniel MacPherson Sergeant Samuel Wyatt is one of the three series protagonists, alongside Thomas McAllister and Gracie Novin, from Retribution to Vendetta. He is an American Marine and JSOC operative working undercover in Libya to track Omar Idrisi who is recruited to Section 20 for his knowledge of Idrisi's operations. He has a reputation for working alone and often encounters friction with other members of Section 20. American intelligence agencies refuse to work with him because of his abrasive personality and insubordinate streak, and it is implied that a failed mission saw him disavowed after it resulted in civilian casualties. Revolution reveals that he was the only survivor of Task Force 18, a special operations unit in Iraq that was ambushed in a roadside attack. Believing that locals were harbouring the insurgents responsible, the survivors started to massacre them and only stopped when Wyatt turned his weapon on his squadmates. With no-one to corroborate his story, Wyatt was disavowed and reassigned to high-risk assignments in the hopes that he would be killed before the massacre could be revealed. He briefly retires during the events of Revolution, but finds himself unable to stay out of the field and rejoins the team. He later admits that he struggled to adjust to civilian life as a found the local supermarket more terrifying than any war zone. He inherits the callsign "Bravo One" after MacAllister's death, but finds the burden of leadership challenging as he feels he cannot make the moral judgements with the same confidence as MacAllister. Wyatt ultimately feels that it is increasingly difficult to justify his actions, especially when Section 20 is disavowed. Despite having their identities reinststed, Wyatt decides to return to civilian life. A running gag has Wyatt showing a lack of tact, often revealing personal information at inopportune moments, such as discussing his imminent divorce with McAllister—who was not aware Wyatt was married—in the middle of a fire fight.: First appearance: Retribution, Episode 1; Last appearance: Vendetta, Episode 10
Gracie Novin	Alin Sumarwata	6–8
Lance Corporal Gracie Novin is one of the three series protagonists, alongside Thomas McAllister and Samuel Wyatt, from Retribution to Vendetta. She is an engineer in the Australian army who is recruited to Section 20 at the last minute to extract MacAllister and Wyatt from Libya. She is the only member of the reformed Section 20 team who was not disgraced prior to joining the team. Novin most frequently takes on the role of driver for her squadmates, but is also a crack shot. While she is a professional soldier, she is often flippant towards other members of Section 20. Novin is less quick to resort to shooting than her squadmates. She has a casual relationship with Will Jensen, and while she rebuffs his interest in making their relationship more serious, she is distraught after his death and shows little concern for her own wellbeing. During the events of Revolution, Novin admits to feeling survivor's guilt and puts herself in dangerous situations to punish herself. She is temporarily promoted to team leader when MacAllister defies orders, but rejects the role of an officer. Coltrane sees potential in her as a leader and suggests that her story of trying to escape "a small town with a small future" is an act as her skills and training are an over-compensation. Revolution sees her take on the role of linguist as she is fluent in Arabic and Russian, can carry out conversations in Mandarin and Cantonese and has a working knowledge of Indonesian, but claims that most of what she knows is swearing. She accidentally kills a civilian during the events of Vendetta when trying to prevent an Albanian gangster from stealing a biological weapon. She later admits that her first kill was during Section 20's mission to stop Idrisi in Libya during Retribution. Novin continues to struggle with survivor's guilt when she breaks under torture to save herself. She later admits that she enlisted in the Army when she was nineteen and that her whole life was influenced by a choice she made as a teenager. She retires to become a civilian.: First appearance: Retribution, Episode 1; Last appearance: Vendetta, Episode 10
Natalie Reynolds	Roxanne McKee	6
Roxanne McKee Captain Natalie Reynolds is the ranking member of Section 20 in the field. She was recruited to the revived Section 20 from the British SRR and often works ahead of the rest of the team gathering intelligence. Reynolds claims to be the exception to Donovan's rule about recruiting "dangerous soldiers for dangerous missions", but it is strongly implied that she was involved in a cover-up by the armed forces as Donovan claims that her career was over before Reynolds met her. Reynolds is forced to kill Donovan when her role in the Project Tenebrae conspiracy was revealed. The events of Revolution reveal that Reynolds was held most responsible for Donovan's death and that she was assigned to guard Non-governmental organizations in Sudan as punishment.: First appearance: Retribution, Episode 1; Last appearance: Retribution, Episode 10
Adeena Donovan	Nina Sosanya	6
Colonel Adeena Donovan is the commanding officer of Section 20. She revived the Section Initiative as a response to the threat posed by Omar Idrisi, albeit in a much smaller capacity than previous iterations. In recruiting operatives for the revived Section 20, she admits that she "likes the wild ones". She frequently comes to conflict with Reynolds, who questions her leadership and her withholding of intelligence from the team. Donovan oversaw "Project Tenebrae", a disavowed intelligence operation that tried to infiltrate terror groups, and was responsible for training Idrisi's wife Jane Lowry. Her desperation to cover up her involvement sees her murder Will Jensen when he uncovers evidence of her involvement in Project Tenebrae. Donovan is killed by Reynolds when Reynolds uncovers the extent of Project Tenebrae and Section 20's role in covering it up. Revolution strongly implies that the revival of the Section Initiative was not sanctioned by the British Government and that Donovan's operation was illegal.: First appearance: Retribution, Episode 1; Last appearance: Retribution, Episode 9
Alexander Coltrane	Jamie Bamber	7–8
Jamie Bamber Colonel Alexander Coltrane is the temporary commanding officer of Section 20. He is appointed to the role after Donovan's death, a position he is unhappy with given Section 20's reputation. He initially clashes with Wyatt and McAllister over their methods, but warms to them when they deliver results. Coltrane was once a promising officer in military intelligence until he suffered a breakdown and became an alcoholic. He was subsequently shuffled between desk jobs and kept out of the field and is now regarded as a cautionary tale by other soldiers. The events of Vendetta reveal that he was stationed as a peacekeeper in the former Yugoslavia during the Balkan War, where he tried to turn captured Serbian army officers into intelligence assets. One of these officers was involved in a massacre almost as soon as he was released, leading to Coltrane's breakdown. He later gives Novin a reprieve after she disobeys a direct order and confronts a friend's killer, reasoning that he can empathise with her loss; he also forgives Wyatt for trusting an unreliable source as he made the same mistake. Coltrane loses the respect of the team when he takes them rogue; while the team are comfortable with unsanctioned missions, Coltrane does not tell them, which causes tension. He has a deadpan sense of humour and most of the team cannot tell when he is joking, being sarcastic, serious or forthright. Section 20 is disbanded during Vendetta and its members disavowed. The team continue their mission regardless, thwarting a plot by Russian intelligence to take control of organised crime in Eastern Europe. Section 20 is re-establishes and Coltrane suggests they could return if they wanted to. Although Wyatt and Novin choose a civilian life, Coltrane's choice is not shown and it is implied that he stays with Section 20.: First appearance: Revolution, Episode 1; Last appearance: Vendetta, Episode 10
Katrina Zarkova	Yasemin Kay Allen	7–8
Captain Katrina Zarkova is a member of the Russian Spetznaz Alpha Group. She and her team are sent to Kuala Lumpur to locate a downed military transport plane carrying a nuclear weapon. Zarkova is under explicit instructions to handle the matter discreetly but she is forced to accept Section 20's help when her team is wiped out by a Triad hit squad. She has a close relationship with her handler Pavel Kugarin, and it is implied that he has an unrequited love for her until his role in the Project Kingfisher conspiracy becomes clear. Zarkova becomes increasingly conflicted, first by relying on Section 20 to aid in her mission and later by Kugarin's actions once she learns about Project Kingfisher. She is particularly troubled by her killing of an innocent security guard during the robbery of a jewellery store to raise funds for Kingfisher. Zarkova discreetly aids Section 20 by deliberately shooting to miss, revealing the locations of hostile forces she is supposedly supporting, and luring them into traps. She ultimately openly aligns herself with Section 20 once Kugarin goes off-mission. Zarkova is offered a permanent spot on the team but declines until such time as she can resolve her standing with her superior officers. Zarkova has a sexual relationship with Coltrane, ostensibly so that she can get information from the team, but it is suggested that they develop deeper feelings for one another. Zarkova returns in Vendetta, where she aids Section 20 in recovering Imperiya, a Russian cyber-weapon. She claims to have been given a medal for her role in stopping Operation Kingfisher, but she was instead branded a traitor for accepting help from Section 20 and forced to work high-risk missions alone. Her handler has orders to kill her, but she gains the upper hand and kills him instead. Knowing that the Russian intelligence agencies will now actively pursue and try to kill her, she returns to Section 20. Coltrane is given an order to kill her on a mission in Tel Aviv to cover up Section 20's operations in Israel, but instead reports her as being killed in action and gives her a new identity. Coltrane later calls her and asks her to use her contacts to locate Russian sleeper agents stationed in Croatia, despite knowing that she risks her life to do so. Zarkova agrees, but warns him that he can never contact her again, implying that she had hoped he would find her after stopping Zayef.: First appearance: Revolution, Episode 1; Last appearance: Vendetta, Episode 9
Manisha Chetri	Varada Sethu	7–8
Lance Corporal Manisha Chetri is a British analyst on temporary secondment to Section 20. She has little field experience and is dismissive of the posting until she makes an error that places the team in danger. She begins to doubt her abilities, requiring Coltrane to manage her. Chetri becomes increasingly confident with fieldwork, and survives capture by Kuragin by offering to help him arm a nuclear device so that she can better-understand it. She is promoted to part of the team in the events of Vendetta where faces a crisis of conscience. When Section 20 learn of a conspiracy between intelligence agencies, Chetri is tasked with securing evidence while the team fend off an assault. She is separated from the group and goes rogue as she does not trust Coltrane to make the evidence public. Chetri is captured by Arianna Demachi and the Russian Foreign Intelligence Service, who take her to a black site in Ukraine and try to get the evidence from her. Chetri appears to break during interrogation, but tricks the Russians into deleting the evidence. Section 20 mount a rescue attempt, but are forced to watch on as Arianna executes Chetri in front of them. Novin later attempts to recover her body, but learns that the Russians destroyed it.: First appearance: Revolution, Episode 3; Last appearance: Vendetta, Episode 9

== Other characters ==
=== Chris Ryan's Strike Back ===
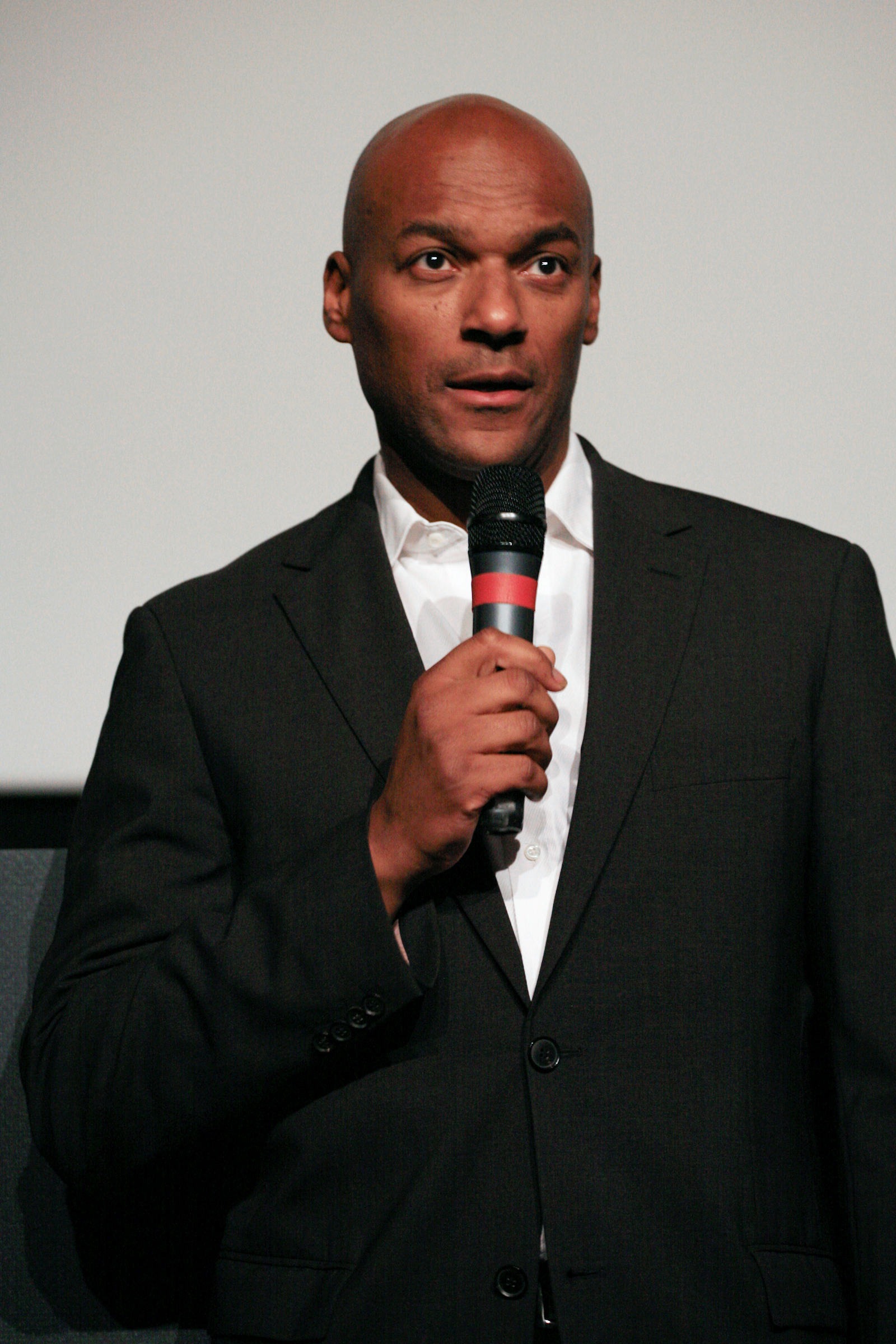
Colin Salmon

- James Middleton (played by Colin Salmon), a civil servant who sits between the British government and the Ministry of Defence, and who oversees Section 20 in the first four episodes.
- Katie Dartmouth (played by Orla Brady), a British war correspondent covering the Iraq war. She is kidnapped by the terrorist group the Sword of Islam. During her capture terrorists cut off one of her hands. John Porter succeeds in rescuing her.
- Hakim Al Nazeri (played by Dhaffer L'Abidine), the leader of the Sword of Islam responsible for kidnapping Dartmouth. Killed by John Porter.
- As'ad (played by Fenar Mohammed Ali), also known as "scarface", a member of the Sword of Islam. Previously, As'ad was thought to be responsible for killing two British soldiers, but in fact witnessed Collinson committing the act. As'ad decides to aid Porter and Dartmouth's escape. However, Collinson refuses As'ad entry into the rescue helicopter, and he is last seen running for his life from other Sword members, and is presumed dead.
- Kenneth Bratton (played by David Butler in Chris Ryan's Strike Back, Alistair Petrie in Project Dawn) is an executive of the weapons contractor ATAT. In the beginning of the first series, he is kidnapped in Iraq in 2003, and then rescued. In Project Dawn, it is revealed that Bratton was pressured to plant VX gas in Iraq, but has since kept it in storage in South Africa. He is kidnapped by Daniel Connolly to steal the VX, and is then killed by Donnolly.
- Diane Porter (played by Nicola Stephenson) is Porter's wife. The two are separated following Porter's resignation. In episode three she is revealed to be diagnosed with cancer, and in the next episode she dies from complications with the surgery.
- Alexandra Porter (played by Laura Greenwood) is Porter's daughter. They become estranged after Porter's resignation. Following her mother's death she lives with Collinson and his wife.

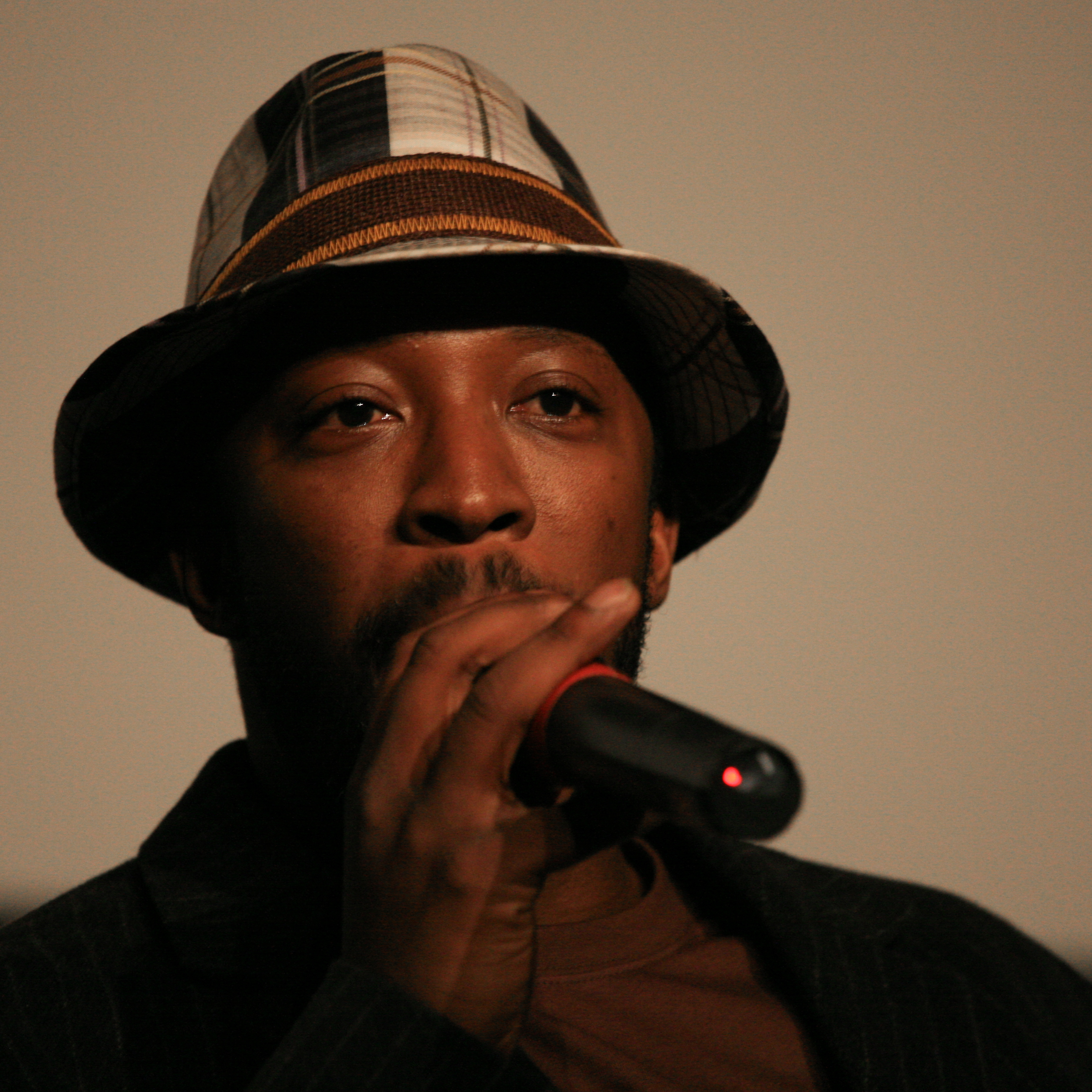
Shaun Parkes

- Felix Masuku (played by Shaun Parkes), a former SAS soldier who was ordered to assassinate Zimbabwean President Robert Mugabe. He is arrested after killing a double. Porter is assigned to break him out of prison and kill him before his trial. Following the escape, Porter spares his life after learning that Masuku was duped to assassinate Mugabe by the British, but in fact a South African diplomat. Masuku, having his roots in Zimbabwe, decides to stay in the country.
- Colonel Tshuma (played by David Harewood), the warden of the prison Masuku is being held. Following Porter and Masuku's escape, Tshuma leads a manhunt to find the two. Killed by Porter.
- Gerald Baxter (played by Ewen Bremner), a British computer hacker working for the American armed forces. At some point he joins the Taliban to intercepts missiles to kill American soldiers. Porter extracts him, but learns he is suffering from a mental disorder after a tragic event in his past. Killed by the Taliban.

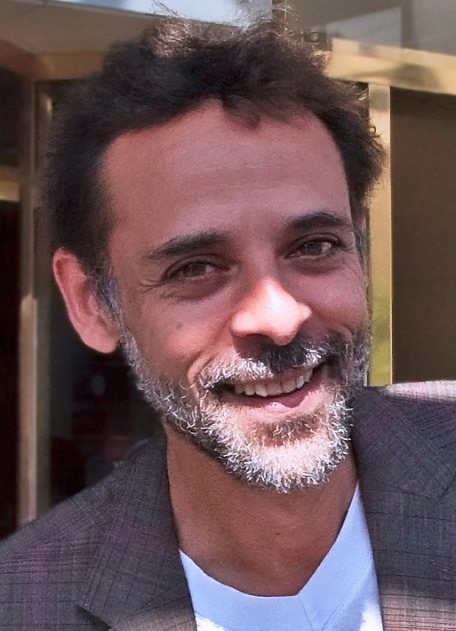
Alexander Siddig

- Zahar Sharq (played by Alexander Siddig), an Afghan politician and Baxter's employer. He conspires with the American government to have Baxter killed in exchange for arms and intelligence so he could lead an Afghan insurgent movement.
- Frank Arlington (played by Toby Stephens), an American liaison in the UK, conspiring with Sharq as he is deemed fit to lead the insurgence movement in Afghanistan. Through his order, Arlington also wants Baxter and Porter killed (Porter survives).

=== Project Dawn ===
- Latif (played by Jimi Mistry) is a Pakistani intelligence agent turned terrorist and the main antagonist of Project Dawn. He is the mastermind behind a plot to attack an international summit in Budapest using VX nerve gas stolen from a hidden cache. Latif is motivated by a desire to expose Operation Trojan Horse, a plot to plant weapons of mass destruction in Iraq prior to the 2003 invasion which Pakistan was complicit in. By revealing the conspirators, Latif hopes to discredit the West and trigger regime change in Pakistan. He is killed when Eleanor Grant forces him to shoot an explosive charge she is carrying.
- Akmal Ramiz (played by Silas Carson) is a Pakistani general who retires to pursue a presidential campaign. Ramiz is held in high esteem by the West for his progressive and pro-democracy stance, but approved of Pakistan's involvement in Operation Trojan Horse and arranged for the capture and execution of John Porter. He is viewed as a liar and a hypocrite by Latif, who attempts to force Ramiz to confess to his role in Trojan Horse. When Ramiz refuses, Latif shoots him.
- Daniel Connelly (played by Liam Cunningham) is a former IRA enforcer turned freelance terrorist who is hired by Latif to acquire samples of VX nerve gas from defence contractor ATAT. During his time in Ireland he gained a reputation for brutality, coercing civilians into carrying out attacks, often promising to spare the loved ones of his victims only to kill them. Connelly claims to be carrying on with the fight against Britain, but Scott accuses him of being little more than an anarchist. Connelly lives up to his reputation when kills Kate Marshall despite promising to spare her, prompting Section 20 to track him down and execute him.
- Gerald Crawford (played by Iain Glen) is a former Royal Marine who turned to arms smuggling. He is an associate of Latif, which brings him to Section 20's attention. In apprehending him, they inadvertently interfere in his attempt to pay a ransom for his estranged daughter, Claire. He agrees to help Section 20 if they secure her release. Crawford is cynical, viewing human interactions as business transactions. He attempts to re-connect with Claire, only to be rebuffed. He is killed in the cross-fire between Sudanese government troops and local Janjaweed militia.
- Clare Somersby (played by Laura Haddock) is a doctor working with an aid organisation in northern Africa and the estranged daughter of Gerard Crawford. She is kidnapped by Janjaweed fighters, prompting Section 20 to launch a rescue attempt to secure her father's co-operation. Her rescue is complicated by her insistence that Stonebridge and Section 20 refrain from violence even when faced with mortal peril. Claire later breaks down under the stress of their situation, admitting that her entire life has been defined by a desire to prove that she is different from her father.
- Tahir (played by Adewale Akinnuoye-Agbaje) is the chieftain of a group of Janjaweed militants terrorising the Dafur region of Sudan. Under his command, the Janjaweed have raided villagers, murdering and raping civilians on a daily basis. Tahir is seemingly killed several times, surviving gunshots, knife wounds and explosions, leading him to claim that he cannot be killed. He is finally shot by Stonebridge when he is momentarily distracted and dies in a state of disbelief.
- Hassani (played by Mel Raido) is an Albanian mobster based in Kosovo who trafficks in drugs, human organs and sexual slavery. He is hired by Latif to take a group of political advisors hostage, giving Latif access to an MI6 agent travelling with them without revealing his presence. Hassani is killed by Latif because he oversteps his instructions and draws the attention of Section 20 to Kosovo while Latif is there.
- Dana (played by Annabelle Wallis) is an economic analyst who is kidnapped in Kosovo by Hassani's men. She forms an immediate connection with Scott and takes a leading role amongst the hostages. When the hostages are re-captured, she is to be sold into sexual servitude until she is rescued by Scott. Dana expresses interest in a relationship with him but he rebuffs her as she means something more important to him.
- Donoghue is an American captain leading KFOR peacekeeping operations. Initially friendly to Scott and Stonebridge, he is revealed to be corrupt and complicit in Hassani's crimes. He is killed by Scott when Scott raids Hassani's sex trafficking operation; cornered and unarmed, he attempts to negotiate his way out, prompting Scott to shoot him.

=== Vengeance ===
- Conrad Knox (played by Charles Dance) is the main antagonist of Vengeance. Knox is a billionaire philanthropist running food aid, vaccination and weapons disarmament projects across Africa who believes that the continent has never fully escaped its colonial-era heritage. He recommissions four Apartheid-era nuclear weapons and acquires the trigger devices from a Libyan nuclear scientist. Knox plans to stage a coup in Zimbabwe with the warheads used as a deterrent to force the West into withdrawing its interests from Africa. When his plan is thwarted, he attempts to distribute the warheads to radical groups to fulfil his plan. Section 20 intervene again, prompting Knox to keep the remaining warheads in Johannesburg where he intends to detonate them in the vaults of a colonial-era bank that he believes is a symbol of the corruption at the foundation of modern Africa. He attempts to flee when Scott and Stonebridge disarm the remaining weapons, but as he is a wanted man, he is recognised by members of the public and shoots himself.
- Karl Matlock is Knox's right-hand man, tasked with recovering the nuclear triggers when the scientist transporting them attempts to sell them to someone else. Once a soldier, he grew disillusioned after witnessing atrocities committed during a peacekeeping mission in the Democratic Republic of the Congo. He joined Knox because he believed in Knox's vision, but quits when the coup fails and Knox plans to detonate the warheads. Matlock is shot and killed by Hanson moments later.
- Craig Hanson, a former SAS operative and friend of Stonebridge. His younger brother Jake enlists in the SAS training programme overseen by Stonebridge, but is suffering from post-traumatic stress disorder and turns on his squadron during a live-fire training exercise. Stonebridge is forced to shoot Jake to save the others, incurring Hanson's wrath. Hanson murders Stonebridge's wife and flees Britain, resurfacing in South Africa where he offers his services to Knox. Stonebridge is nearly consumed with rage upon seeing Hanson and very nearly compromises Section 20's mission. Stonebridge recomposes himself and kills Hanson before disarming the bombs under Johannesburg.
- Rebecca Levi (played by Lyne Renée), a Mossad agent sent to South Africa to kill two Apartheid-era nuclear scientists before they can complete the warheads to Knox as Israel had facilitated the South African nuclear programme. She forms a relationship with Scott who recognises the toll her work is taking on her. Rebecca succeed in her mission but forces Scott to shoot her, hoping that he will kill her. Scott refuses, leaving her to be attended to by paramedics. She later appears in Shadow Warfare where she stays with Mossad and goes undercover to investigate links between a terrorist financier and South American drug cartels. She assists Section 20 in extracting their target, but is shot and killed during a firefight.
- Christy Bryant (played by Stephanie Vogt) is a CIA agent working in Africa who has a history with Scott; after being dishonourably discharged, Scott worked as a contract killer with Bryant as his handler and lover. Many of her actions in Africa are ostensibly designed to stop terror groups from gaining a foothold, but actually benefit Knox as the CIA sees the merit in his planned coup. When Knox is accused of assassinating a popular Zimbabwean democracy activist and of having nuclear weapons, the CIA cut all ties with him and disavow Bryant. She tries to work with Section 20 to acquire the nuclear warheads and reclaim her standing with the CIA. Although she provides reliable information, Scott refuses to trust her and Bryant is left to fend for herself. She later appears in Legacy when Scott and Stonebridge are being pursued by a CIA assassination team. Bryant betrays them both for money, but is shot and killed by the assassins.

=== Shadow Warfare ===
- Leo Kamali is a British-Lebanese accountant and financier to al-Zuhari, a notorious and elusive terrorist. Kamali is apprehended by Section 20 in Colombia, but reveals that he is a CIA agent tasked with infiltrating al-Zuhari's network. He aids Section 20 in thwarting al-Zuhari's plans until Section 20 discover that al-Zuhari was killed in an Israeli airstrike and that Kamali has become the de facto leader of the network. His "aid" was actually intended to tie up loose ends and enable him to acquire a weaponised smallpox virus that he plans to release at a NATO air base. The attack is stopped and Kamali detained by his backer Arkady Ulyanov to be handed over to Section 20. Scott and Stonebridge are forced to kill him in front of his daughter when he attempts to release a sample of smallpox.
- Ester Kamali is Leo Kamali's daughter. He believes that she is the one good thing he has done in the world and tries to shelter her from it and his true nature. She forms an unexpected bond with Scott that is broken when he is forced to kill her father in front of her.
- Miguel Gomez is a Colombian police captain turned cartel leader. He and the other cartels form an alliance with the al-Zuhari network to finance their attacks. When Section 20 attack his estate, he swears revenge and succeeds in killing Rebecca and capturing Scott and Stonebridge. He is killed by Scott when they break free.
- James Leatherby (played by Dougray Scott) is a former SAS officer who works for al-Zuhari as a smuggler, courier and enforcer. He was caught by the Republican Guard during the 2003 invasion of Iraq and disavowed by the British government, but escaped and sought revenge. Leatherby is a homosexual with a dominant personality and is prone to homicidal fits of rage. Section 20 exploit this by apprehending his lover and threatening him to interrogate Leatherby. Leatherby commits suicide by shooting his lover, forcing Scott and Stonebridge to turn their weapons on him.
- Mairead McKenna is the leader of a Real IRA cell driven out of Ireland. Now based in Budapest, they make a deal with al-Zuhari to attack the British Embassy with an improvised mortar in exchange for accessing a secure NATO network in the building. McKenna resents the British presence in general and Philip Locke in particular, especially after he reveals that her brother Francie was an informant for the British and threatens to tarnish his reputation within the Republican movement. McKenna is killed by Kamali during the attack on the embassy.
- Nina Pirogova (played by Tereza Srbova) is a Major in the FSB, the Russian security services. She uses her position to break Scott and Stonebridge out of Black Bear prison and assists in the raid on the Dzehna biological weapons facility. Pirogova returns in Legacy to extract Scott and Stonebridge from North Korea and to help track rogue North Korean agents in Vienna before leaving the team for good—with a warning that if they need help in the future, they should ask someone else—after their operation sees one of her friends killed.
- Arkady Ulyanov is a powerful Russian mobster with ties to the security services and influence over federal politics. He sends his son Viktor to a meeting with Kamali and the Colombian cartels, but swears revenge on Section 20 after Viktor is killed in a raid. He operates the private Black Bear prison in Moscow, providing prisoners to al-Zuhari as test subjects for experimentation with a weaponised smallpox virus. When Section 20 prevent Kamali from carrying out the attack, Locke persuades Ulyanov to surrender Kamali to Section 20 in exchange for Scott and Stonebridge. Ulyanov agrees, but is killed by Section 20 when Kamali attempts to release the smallpox virus.

=== Legacy ===
- Mei Foster (played by Michelle Yeoh) is the wife of Robin Foster, the British Ambassador to Thailand, and the major antagonist of Legacy. She is revealed to be Li-Na, a sleeper agent working for North Korea's Office 39, and had been trained for her mission since childhood. Mei uses her position to secure vital components for North Korea's nuclear weapons programme and to orchestrate the assassination of a North Korean general by her husband to further divide North Korea and the West. Although Mei succeeds in her mission, she becomes increasingly frustrated by North Korean politicians who refuse to act on her knowledge of Section 20. When Scott and Stonebridge sabotage the missile programme and escape from her custody, Mei is held responsible and her execution ordered. She escapes with the help of her lover, Kwon, and turns rogue, planning to detonate an improvised nuclear weapon at a United Nations conference in Geneva. Scott and Stonebridge intervene and take her into custody but she is summarily executed by a CIA kill team during her prisoner transfer. Her final words are a warning to Scott and Stonebridge, allowing them to escape the same fate.
- Kwon (played by Will Yun Lee) is a childhood friend and later lover of Mei. Like Mei, he was trained from childhood to become a sleeper agent and thus they represent the only genuine relationship the two have ever had. Kwon's career takes him into politics and he is assigned to be Mei's "liaison" upon her return to Korea; in reality, he is to spy on her. Mei repeatedly advises him to report that she is corrupt as a way of avoiding retribution when she is found responsible for the failure of the missile programme. However, Kwon kills a senior officer to aid her escape and the two turn rogue. He is killed when Scott and Stonebridge storm the UN conference.
- Finn is Scott's teenage son who Scott meets for the first time in Bangkok. After getting in trouble with his step-father, Finn runs to Bangkok where he initially believes Scott works as an IT consultant. The two are forced to go on the run when the Yakuza attack Section 20. The two start to bond before Scott is called upon to infiltrate North Korea. Although they part ways, Mei organises his abduction and uses him to capture Scott and Stonebridge, and then to confess that their actions in North Korea were a deliberate act of war. The three escape, but Finn is shot in the process. After recovering in a Russian hospital, he is escorted home by Martinez. He is later seen going on a road trip to Las Vegas with Scott and Stonebridge.
- Robin Foster (played by Tim McInnerny) is the British ambassador to Thailand and the husband of Mei Foster. He has dedicated his career to the denuclearisation of the Korean Peninsula. Foster succeeds in getting the North Koreans to agree to a summit in Bangkok, but his plans are jeopardised when his daughter Chloe is kidnapped. He contacts Phillip Locke to have Section 20 discreetly handle the situation, but surrenders to the kidnappers' demands when the rescue attempt fails. The kidnappers use Foster to deliver a bomb to the North Korean delegation, which kills a general. Foster is critically injured in the blast and is later murdered by Mei in his hospital bed.
- Ray McQueen is a British gangster based in Bangkok who kidnaps Chloe Foster. He is a local gun-for-hire employed by the Yakuza to conceal their role in the crime. Section 20 track him down after the embassy bombing and persuade him to assist them by protecting his wife and unborn child. McQueen is killed when the Yakuza send corrupt Bangkok police to attack Section 20's headquarters.
- Shiro, the son of a senior Yakuza crime lord who oversees operations in South-East Asia. He supplies Mei with materials for the missile programme in exchange for shipments of methamphetamines. Mei maniputes him into killing his father to assume control of the entire Yakuza operation and uses them to attack Section 20. Mei later abandons him when he is seriously injured; realising her betrayal, Shiro prepares to aid Philip Locke, but is shot by a CIA kill team.
- Christopher Desmond (played by Michael McElhatton) is a freelance bomb-maker. Known by his alias Oppenheimer, he works for the highest bidder whether they are terrorist groups or governments. Desmond shows no remorse for his crimes, claiming he simply builds the bombs for his clients. He is enlisted by Mei to build an improvised nuclear device until he is tracked down by Locke. Locke accuses Desmond of building the bomb that killed his son Anthony, but Desmond refuses to accept responsibility and instead claims that Locke himself was the target and that Desmond was hired by the British government. Desmond denies knowing why Locke was targeted, but it is strongly implied that his death would fulfil a political objective. When Desmond refuses to divulge the location of the bomb he built for Mei, Locke executes him.
- Charles Ridley (played by James Wilby) is a bureaucrat working for an anonymous government department and Locke's commanding officer. He openly questions the value of intelligence gathered by Section 20 and even goes so far as to disband them when Locke disobeys orders. Ridley arranges for Mei and Section 20 to be killed because it is politically convenient for Mei's attack in Geneva to be covered up. Stonebridge and Scott ultimately survive and Stonebridge visits Ridley to remind him of the human cost to his decisions and threatens his life if anyone comes after him. The events of Retribution strongly imply that Ridley was assassinated and that Stonebridge was held responsible.
- Faber and Mason are members of a private military contractor working as a CIA-sanctioned assassination team. They function as bounty hunters, given greater rewards for quicker kills. They pose as smugglers to get close to their target, Shiro, before Section 20 inadvertently intervene. Mason and Faber join forces to thwart the transfer of missile components, but turn on Section 20 as soon as they get a chance to kill Shiro. They later lead the ambush on Section 20, killing Mei and leading the hunt for Scott and Stonebridge, going so far as to torture civilians for information. When Scott and Stonebridge are cornered in a barn, Faber offers them the chance to buy their freedom. He expresses disbelief that they are not as corrupt as he is before Stonebridge kills him. Mason is killed in the subsequent assault on the barn.

=== Retribution ===
- Will Jensen (played by Phil Dunster), an intelligence analyst working for Section 20. He is eager to get experience working in the field and resents being called "Computer Guy" by the rest of the team. Jensen gradually gets more field experience but comes into conflict with the other team members who feel that he is "playing soldier" and unable to handle the demands of fieldwork. He is captured and tortured by Jane Lowry, losing an eye in the process. Although he returns to work, he is murdered by Donovan when he discovers her involvement with Lowry. A running gag sees Wyatt unable to pronounce his name, referring to him as "Johnson".
- Omair Idrisi (played by Don Hany), a terrorist who established himself in Libya after the fall of the Gaddafi regime. He was captured in Syria, but after his men infiltrated the army unit escorting him, he is considered so dangerous that British military intelligence re-activated Section 20 to apprehend him. He was radicalised after his father was killed in an airstrike that misidentified its target. Idrisi purchases Stinger missiles from an American arms dealer and plans to unify the factions fighting in Libya to attack Western interests. He is seemingly killed in an airstrike when Section 20 raid his mountainside bunker but is subsequently revealed to have survived and is incarcerated in a secret prison in Poland. Following his escape, he reunites with his wife Jane Lowry and attempts to recover a register of all British military intelligence operations and release it to the Russians.
- Jane Lowry (played by Katherine Kelly), Idrisi's wife and the major antagonist of Retribution. Originally a prostitute, she was radicalized after spending time in a British prison and assumes control over her husband's men when he is captured in Syria. Lowry is the mastermind behind his escape and encourages him to advance his plans and continues to supply terrorist groups with material support after his death. She abducts a Russian biochemist and forces him to develop a lethal nerve agent as part of her plans and plans to infiltrate a notorious secret prison and ultimately expose "Project Tenebrae", a disavowed intelligence operation that she was a part of with Adeena Donovan. As part of Project Tenebrae, Lowry planned to infiltrate her later-husband's terrorist group with the knowledge and support of British intelligence, but betrayed them after she was radicalized by Idrisi and attacked a civilian target, killing an American diplomat. She created "the Atlas", a dossier compiling active intelligence operations, which she plans to release, compromising British and American relations. Lowry is shot and killed by MacAllister shortly after being reunited with her husband.
- Morgan Ives (played by Trevor Eve), an American arms dealer with a reputation for selling anything to anyone and a crass, bigoted outlook on humanity. He supplies armed forces, private military contractors and terrorist cells alike. Ives manipulates all three for his own profit. His helicopter is shot down after he sells a consignment of Stinger missiles to Idrisi, and forces Section 20 to escort him to safety in exchange for what he knows. Section 20 abandon him in a Bedouin military camp. Ives is implied to have been killed by the Bedouins, but he survives and discreetly follows Section 20. He captures them when they have Idrisi in their custody and after attempting to kill them, he tries to use Idrisi to force Lowry to lead him to the Atlas, which he intends to sell to the highest bidder. He is overpowered by Idrisi's Russian collaborators, who execute him after telling a bigoted joke about Russians.
- Rosa Varga, Jozef Varga's sister and the leader of Magyar Ultra, a white nationalist street gang based in Budapest. Under Rosa's leadership, the group transformed itself from a loose collection of thugs to a citywide criminal enterprise. She shows no particular dedication to Magyar Ultra's violent ideology and instead seeks enough money to escape her criminal life. Rosa is contacted by Jane Lowry to locate a biochemist named Markov, believing that Lowry can pay her enough to start a new life. She is killed by her brother when she betrays him by freeing Markov.
- Josef Varga, Rosa Varga's brother and recruiter for Magyar Ultra. He was once a soldier serving in the NATO coalition in Afghanistan before being dishonourably discharged for a racially charged assault. Like Rosa, he is looking to escape his criminal life, but he is often temperamental and impulsive. Josef is killed in a shoot-out with Section 20.
- Kamil Markov, a fugitive Russian biochemist. Once a pivotal figure in the Russian chemical weapons programme, he was forced into hiding after exposing researchers to Novichok, a potent nerve gas, as revenge for his being fired. Now living in Budapest, he is forcibly recruited by Jane Lowry to continue his work. He is killed in the crossfire between the FSB and Section 20 when Section 20 raid his lab in Pripyat.
- Milos Borisovich (played by Peter Firth), the heir to a Belorussian crime syndicate. He is greatly concerned with his family's honour but fears that his son is too weak to take over the business. Borisovich loans his methamphetamine labs to Lowry, allowing her to start producing Novichok. Section 20 infiltrate his villa during his mother's funeral, inadvertently incurring his wrath when Wyatt and MacAllister hijack the hearse with her body inside and use it as a getaway vehicle. After Section 20 repeatedly destroy his production facilities, he makes a deal with Lowry allowing him to hand Markov over to the FSB to collect the bounty on his head. He is killed when Lowry betrays him and exposes him to Novichok.
- Yuri Shevchenko, a semi-retired hitman working for Borisovich. He tracks Section 20 across Belarus and Ukraine, repeatedly trying to kill them. His preferred weapon of choice is a garrotte or manual strangulation. After successfully ambushing Wyatt, he is overpowered by MacAllister and the two hang him in the ensuing fight.
- Volkan, Omair Idrisi's lieutenant in Europe. He assumes de facto control of Idrisi's operations after his apparent death and Lowry's disappearance. He underestimates the loyalty of his men to Idrisi and Lowry, who begins to suspect that he is disloyal but offers him the chance to recommit to her cause.
- Rachel Sheridan, a former CIA officer who joined German-American private military contractor Octagon. She designs high-security black site prisons for the extraordinary rendition of terrorism suspects where they can be detained and questioned without civilian oversight or being bound by the Geneva Convention. Sheridan is unapologetic, claiming that she is perfectly justified in her actions and willing to sacrifice her loved ones in the name of national security.
- Colonel Parker, Wyatt's commanding officer prior to his joining Section 20. Ostensibly part of the Joint Special Operations Command, he is running an illegal rendition programme, detaining and torturing terrorism suspects.
- Arkady Krupkin and Katya, a pair of Russian GRU operatives who lead a team similar to Section 20. They support Idrisi in the search for the Atlas and lead the defence of a Russian military intelligence bunker that Section 20 attack in retaliation. Katya is knocked out after surrendering to Reynolds, claiming that she was only ever doing her job; Krupkin forces Wyatt to kill him instead of deactivating an explosive charge in the bunker.

=== Revolution ===
- Pavel Kuragin is a Russian military intelligence officer who acts as a liaison between Moscow and Alpha Group units in the field. He is Zarkova's handler, although she largely keeps him in the dark about her activities. He is later revealed to be an agent of Kingfisher. Kuragin is responsible for the theft of a Russian nuclear weapon and deals through a complex network of cut-outs and shell companies to conceal his identity. He is disavowed by the Russian government following the failure of Project Kingfisher and turns rogue, stealing the keys to a chemical weapons facility in Azerbaijan. He forces Zarkova and Novin to kill him rather than tell them the override code. The name Pavel Kuragin is an alias, though he claims his birth name is unimportant. Zarkova identifies him as Denis Brusilov, who was recruited by the army as a young man after spending years in foster care. His superiors exploited his need for acceptance and his need to be made to feel special, turning him into Kuragin. It is implied that he was present when Section 20 raided a GRU server farm in Retribution.
- Operations Directorate 338 is the name given to a clandestine branch of the Russian intelligence community. The Directorate is made up of nationalist and ultra-nationalist sympathisers in the military, intelligence and diplomatic corps. They believe that Russia has been humiliated by the West following the imposition of economic sanctions that wiped $600 billion from the Russian economy and pushed twenty percent of the population below the poverty line. They devised Project Kingfisher as a way of restoring Russia's dignity. They arrange for a Russian warhead to be stolen and rebuilt as portable suitcase bombs to conceal their origin. These are then given to terrorist groups who are apprehended by military units and used as evidence to support a coup, installing a puppet government friendly to Russia. When Project Kingfisher—and a series of related operations—is shut down, Operations Directorate 338 support its agents by giving them the means to fire missiles armed with VX nerve gas on Western cities to force a war between Russia and the West.
- Laoshu (played by Tom Wu) is an enforcer for a Triad based in Kuala Lumpur. He disappeared for eight years after the "Night of Blood" in which he single-handedly killed every member of a rival gang and has since become the stuff of urban legend. His reputation precedes him as he is able to kill most of an Alpha Group unit in minutes, overpower McAllister and evade police. Laoshu is revealed to be the biological father of police captain Amy Leong, and that the "Night of Blood" was revenge for a targeted hit that killed his wife. He is later killed by Novin after a fistfight.
- James McKitterick is the British High Commissioner to Malaysia. Coltrane and Section 20 report directly to him, but begin to suspect he is deliberately hindering them after the Triads are tipped off to a raid. They learn that McKitterick owes gambling debts to the Triads. The Triads force him to authorise passage of a truck carrying a nuclear weapon out of Kuala Lumpur. Section 20 try to extract him and have him rescind the order, but believing the Triads will kill his family, McKitterick commits suicide.
- Gopan is a self-taught nuclear physicist and the leader of a Hindu nationalist terror cell. He is initially introduced as the right-hand man of Anjali Vartak, but has misled her and used her to finance his plot. Gopan takes possession of the nuclear warhead and convert it into two dirty bombs for Kingfisher before passing them on to Kingfisher's next cut-out. While his men are well-funded, they are under-equipped and poorly trained; nevertheless, they represent a different kind of threat as they are a danger to everyone around them. Gopan is killed by Zarkova as he tries to escort the bombs out of Goa.
- Anjali Vartak is an Indian textile magnate, aspiring politician and privately a radical Hindu nationalist. She blames Muslim extremists for the death of her infant son and plots revenge, planning to detonate radiological devices to irradiate mosques throughout Goa. However, Gopan believes that her privileged life means her anger will be short-lived and instead encourages her to pursue a career in politics to legitimise their cause. When her ties to the terrorist group are revealed, Anjali plans a suicide mission. She is killed when Wyatt tackles her out of the window of a fourth-story in an effort to wrestle her bomb away.
- Jean-Baptiste Zaza is a drug lord producing methamphetamines in Myanmar. Fleeing his native Rwanda during the 1994 genocide, he found himself in South-West Asia and rose quickly through the ranks of the gangs. Zaza styles himself as a liberator, funding schools and hospitals with drug money, but in reality he is deeply paranoid and prone to jealous rages that quickly turn violent. He intercepts Kingfisher's courier transporting the dirty bombs and attempts to sell them to al-Shabaab militants. Section 20 attempt to intercept the buyer and locate the bombs, but lose the intelligence. Zaza is killed in an explosion when Section 20 raid his compound and secure the bombs.
- Lauren Gillespie is a DEA agent stationed in Myanmar and an acquaintance of Alexander Coltrane. It is implied that she was exiled to a remote province as punishment for her renegade tactics. She likens Myanmar to the Wild West and is quite happy to use murder and extortion to achieve her objectives. Gillespie is mostly interested in keeping the drug gangs of Myanmar in a state of détente and is happy to let the stolen dirty bombs fall into terrorist hands to maintain that state. She uses DEA slush funds to illegally finance Zaza's rise to power, hoping to earn the favour of her superiors, but Zaza is aware of her plotting and instead controls her. Gillespie is mortally wounded during the raid on Zaza's compound.
- Madison Wyatt is Wyatt's wife. While married, they live separately. When she serves him with divorce papers and he is shot by Kuragin, Wyatt reconsiders their relationship and attempts to make amends. Unable to adjust to civilian life, he lies to her and returns to the field but ultimately feels guilt when Kuragin sends assassins after her.
- Hassan Ahmad is the former leader of a jihadist terror network until he was imprisoned. He was released as part of a deradicalisation programme and has largely been forgotten by the world until Kuragin offers him a chance at notoriety. He attempts to detonate one of Kugarin's bombs in Jakata, only to find that it is rigged to be inoperable. Section 20 attempt to apprehend him as proof of Kugarin's plot, but he is shot before he can be taken into custody.
- Colonel Aldo is the leader of Squad Komodo, an elite Indonesian counter-terrorist unit. Squad Komodo was disbanded after it resorted to kidnappings and extrajudicial killings, becoming little more than a death squad. Most of the unit was court-martialled and stripped of their ranks, but Aldo was allowed to keep his position as a political show of good faith. He uses Kugarin's support to reform Squad Komodo as a mercenary unit with access to cutting-edge weapons and equipment. Under Kugarin's plan, Aldo would lead a military coup in Indonesia, becoming a puppet of the Russian government. He is apprehended after Section 20 kill the Squad Komodo members; Wyatt empathises with his frustration at a government ambivalent to the safety of its own people, convincing Aldo to lower his weapon.
- Natasha Petchrenko is a former SVR operative who was disavowed and her death staged by the Russian government to free up her ability to carry out covert operations. She goes rogue and joins Kuragin after Project Kingfisher—and several other, similar operations—is shut down. Petchrenko brokers a deal with American tech entrepreneur Caleb Montgomery to acquire a weaponised computer virus capable of breaching Russian military encryption, which they then use to bring down a defunct satellite carrying missile launch keys. She is killed when she is exposed to VX nerve gas during Section 20's raid on the missile silo.
- Artem Orlov is a former Russian marine who, like Petchrenko, was disavowed and his death staged by the Russian government to free up his ability to carry out covert operations. He goes rogue after Project Kingfisher is shut down, justifying his actions as patriotism. However, he has trouble with Kuragin's willingness to kill indiscriminately, especially when it means killing Russians. He is killed when Kuragin uses him as a human shield.
- Chief of General Staff Pokrovsky is the liaison between Section 20 and the Russian Armed Forces and Zarkova's commanding officers. He oversees the interrogation and recruitment of Coltrane and Section 20, but grows to resent Russia's dependence on the West to thwart Kuragin and comes to sympathise with him. Pokrovsky interferes with Section 20's investigation by informing Kuragin of their activities and attempts to have Zarkova court martialled when she deduces that someone in the chain of command is working with Kuragin. He is killed after his interrogation by Section 20 when he draws a weapon on Coltrane.

=== Vendetta ===
- Zayef Hidjari is the main antagonist of Vendetta. The brothers are Bosnian Muslims whose parents were killed in a massacre during the Balkan War. They became radicalised and formed a splinter group of Islamic State. They are well-organised and well-funded, but largely unknown to Western intelligence agencies. Zayef grows increasingly unstable and paranoid, killing his men on the mere suspicion of disloyalty. He plans an attack on a NATO security conference in Münich, followed by waves of attacks across Europe. Section 20 catch him as he attempts to smuggle a shipment of weapons out of Albania and he provides them with evidence of a conspiracy between intelligence agencies. He dies when he goads Coltrane into summarily executing him.
- Mahir Hidjari is Zayef's older brother and responsible for planning the brothers' attacks. He claims loyalty to Zayef, but is disgusted by him and working for British intelligence. Mahir is to oversee a false flag operation that would see Zayef stage an unsuccessful attack on Münich and then get caught shipping arms to terror cells across Europe. This would give the West an excuse to deploy soldiers in Eastern Europe. However, Zayef learns of Mahir's treachery and straps him into a suicide vest in Münich, killing him and leaving Zayef free to carry out his plan without Mahir controlling him.
- Dr. Helen McCluskey is a British biochemist stationed in Pristina, Kosovo. She is working on a covert program to weaponise a strain on the Marbug virus that was started and later abandoned by Serbia during the Balkan War. She is captured by the Demarchi crime family and forced to reveal the virus' location. Section 20 is deployed to rescue her, but Coltrane is given a secret order to execute her to prevent her from becoming a whistleblower.
- Edon Demachi is the patriarch of an Italian-Albanian crime family in Kosovo. He is the mastermind behind the theft of a weaponised strain of the Marbug virus. His family is quite small within the Albanian mafia as his father disgraced their name in a feud with the Italian Vironi family. Edon hopes that he can reconcile with the Veronis by having his son Loric marry the Veronis' heir. He is killed in a shoot-out with McAllister.
- Arianna Demachi (born Elena Stanikova) is Edon Demachi's wife. She is more compassionate towards her son than Edon is, but is equally ruthless. She swears a blood feud against Section 20 after her husband's death. Arianna takes control of the Albanian mafia and is revealed to be a Russian deep-cover agent tasked with seizing control of organised crime in the former Yugoslavia. Her family's dealings with Zayef reveal Britain and America's role in his plot, and she tries to secure a hard drive with evidence on it for use against the West. Although she fails when the drive is erased, the GRU decide to invest $250 million to continue her takeover of organised crime in Eastern Europe, allowing them to destabilise Europe by controlling the flow of drugs and guns in major cities. Realising that Section 20 will never stop hunting her, Arianna steals the $250 million and starts a new life in Mexico. Section 20 nevertheless track her down and Coltrane executes her.
- Loric Demachi is the son of Edon and Adrianna. He is to be married to the daughter of a rival family, but is a closeted homosexual. He resents his father and agrees to help Section 20 if they kill him. However, he later regrets his actions and joins Arianna in swearing a blood feud. He and his mother take control in of the Albanian mafia in a bloody coup and Loric admits to Zayef that he betrayed his father to Section 20. Arianna uses this to remove him from power and ends up stabbing him to death when he resists.
- Yoni Spiegel is an Israeli patrol officer who is caught up in a gun battle involving Section 20. He is self-conscious as his colleagues do not take him seriously, and jumps at the chance to help McAllister. McAllister tries to enlist him as a local source, but Spiegel takes things too far when he tries to arrest Zayef and Mahir, leading to a shoot-out in a bus terminal. He is killed when Zayef's men storm his police precinct.
- Nadav Topal is a Palestinian taxi driver working in Tel Aviv. He attempts to sell a Russian military-grade cyberweapom that he steals from a treasonous Russian officer. He is killed by Spiegel when he resists arrest.
- Danny Dahar is a drug runner and friend of Topal. He kidnaps and tortures Novin for the cyberweapon Imperiya and is able to capture most of Section 20 when they attempt a rescue. He is killed by Coltrane.
- Yana Haim is an Israeli gangster-turned-property developer. Topal turns to him to try and sell Imperiya, but Haim tries to double-cross him. Topal kills him in self-defence when Danny and his men attack Haim's villa.
- Sir James Spencer is the head of MI6 and the creator of Section 20. He has a father-son relationship with Coltrane, which he tries to use to influence Section 20's operations; Coltrane sees through this, but still views Spencer as a mentor. Spencer is the architect of the plan to use Zayef and tries to reason with Coltrane when Section 20 uncover the conspiracy. He is mortally wounded when the CIA betray him and dies when he sets off a grenade, killing several assassins in the process.
- Carolyn Fortier is a senior CIA officer and Spencer's partner in the plan to use Zayef. She sees his belief in Coltrane as a weakness and has no problem sending a hit squad to kill them when Spencer tries to reason with Coltrane. She later recruits Section 20 to help find Chetri before the Russians do, but discreetly authorises Wyatt to kill her if necessary. She is killed when a bomb planted by a Russian sleeper agent is set off.
- Sevastian Levkin is Arianna's handler in the GRU. He has little field experience and tries to take over her interrogation of Chetri, ostensibly to protect her if it goes poorly, but she rebuffs him. He is later transferred to managing a casino in Armenia and launder Arianna's money, which he sees as a demotion. He is killed by Novin for his role in Chetri's death.
