= ATI Tray Tools =

Freeware program developed by Ray Adams

- Developer: Konstantin Adamov (a.k.a. Ray Adams)
- Stable release: 1.6.9.1486 / April 22, 2010; 15 years ago
- Preview release: 1.7.9.1573 / October 31, 2011; 14 years ago
- Operating system: Windows 2000, Windows XP, Windows Vista, Windows 7
- Type: Overclocking
- License: Freeware
- Website: www.guru3d.com/article/ati-tray-tools-/

ATI Tray Tools (ATT) is a freeware program developed by Ray Adams for ATI Radeon video cards.

ATI Tray Tools is an advanced tweaker-application that resides in the notification area of the Windows taskbar and allows instant access to video options and settings via a right-click menu. It is normally used as an alternative to the more bulky official Catalyst Control Center (CCC), but it can also run in tandem with it.

== Main features of ATI Tray Tools ==
- The ability to change the resolution, colors, rotation, and extended desktop settings directly from ATT's right-click menu.
- Changing of OpenGL/Direct3D settings (antialiasing or anisotropic filtering, for example) separate from one another.
- Game profiles, a feature allowing specific OpenGL/Direct3D settings for each game or 3D application.
- Over/Underclocking of GPU and memory of video boards
- Hotkey mapping
- The taking of screenshots
- Hardware monitoring
- OnScreen Display: When an OpenGL/Direct3D application running, the FPS, 3D API type, GPU Activity, and related information are overlaid on top of the rendering stream on a corner of the screen.
- CrossFire support
- Support of nearly 20 languages
- Support for plugins created for ATI Tray Tools

== Supported operating systems ==
ATI Tray Tools supports both 32 and 64-bit versions of:

- Windows 2000
- Windows XP
- Windows Server 2003
- Most builds of Windows Codename: Longhorn
- Windows Vista
- Windows Server 2008
- Windows 7

== Versions history ==
- 1.0 (February 3, 2004) - initial release
- 1.0.0.190 (February 5, 2004) - first update
- 1.0.0.195 (February 6, 2004)
- 1.0.0.200 (February 8, 2004)
- 1.0.0.205 (February 9, 2004)
- 1.0.1.516 (February 2, 2005)
- 1.0.1.527 (February 25, 2005)
- 1.0.1.528 (February 27, 2005)
- 1.0.1.538 (March 16, 2005)
- 1.0.2.600 (April 17, 2005)
- 1.0.2.625 (April 24, 2005)
- 1.0.2.640 (May 1, 2005)
- 1.0.2.663 (May 12, 2005)
- 1.0.2.673 (May 17, 2005)
- 1.0.2.685
- 1.0.2.690 (June 10, 2005)
- 1.0.2.705
- 1.0.3.720 (June 18, 2005)
- 1.0.3.730 (August 18, 2005)
- 1.0.3.750 (September 28, 2005)
- 1.0.3.755 (September 30, 2005)
- 1.0.4.780 (October 19, 2005)
- 1.0.5.815 (January 9, 2006)
- 1.0.5.820 (January 17, 2006)
- 1.0.5.824 (January 27, 2006)
- 1.0.5.877 (April 14, 2006)
- 1.0.5.880 (April 17, 2006)
- 1.2.6.930 (September 19, 2006)
- 1.2.6.940 (September 28, 2006)
- 1.2.6.955 (November 6, 2006)
- 1.2.6.964 (December 6, 2006)
- 1.3.6.1042 (May 22, 2007)

Beta Versions

- 1.3.6.1056 Beta (September 17, 2007)
- 1.3.6.1066 Beta (October 29, 2007)
- 1.3.6.1067 Beta (November 5, 2007) - {bundled with Omega driver 4.8.442}
- 1.4.7.1185 Beta (May 23, 2008)
- 1.4.7.1206 Beta (June 26, 2008)
- 1.5.9.1294 Beta (September 16, 2008)
- 1.6.9.1340 Beta (October 3, 2008)
- 1.6.9.1374 Beta (December 9, 2008)
- 1.6.9.1382 Beta (February 21, 2009)
- 1.6.9.1386 Beta (April 9, 2009)
- 1.6.9.1391 Beta (July 28, 2009)
- 1.6.9.1435 Beta (November 18, 2009)
- 1.6.9.1472 Beta (February 6, 2010)
- 1.6.9.1486 Beta (April 22, 2010)
- 1.7.9.1528 Beta (November 15, 2010)
- 1.7.9.1531 Beta (December 10, 2010)
- 1.7.9.1537 Beta (December 24, 2010)
- 1.7.9.1551 Beta (March 19, 2011)
- 1.7.9.1564 Beta (May 25, 2011)
- 1.7.9.1573 Beta (October 31, 2011)

Main Features of 1.4.7.xxxx versions

- HD2xxx/HD3xxx cards are supported
- Nearly full DirectX 10 support
- CPU monitoring

Main Features of 1.5.x.xxxx versions

- HD4xxx support
- Overclocking and monitoring of both video boards in CrossFire
- Redesigned Monitoring of Graphs and FlashOSD
- Full DirectX 10 support

Main Features of 1.6.x.xxxx versions

- Full Unicode Support

Main Features of 1.7.9.xxxx versions

- Force RefreshRate option has been removed
- Updated support for HD5xxx series. New AA modes have been included. Please recreate your 3D profiles if you have HD5xxx/6xxx video board
- Implemented support for HD6870/HD6850
- Improved support for some HD5xxx boards
- Support for new AI modes has been implemented for HD5xxx/HD6xxx
- Implemented high granularity for LOD adjustment
- Fixed bug when LOD value doesn't get applied when you load profile from main menu
- Fixed bug when value of FlipQueueSize doesn't properly restored
- Included delay option before applying colors for game profile
- Implemented support for HD6970/HD6950
- Implemented support for AA Enhanced Quality introduced in new Catalyst drivers

== See also ==
- 3D computer graphics
- Tweaking
- Overclocking
