= AT&T CallVantage =

VoIP telephone service

AT&T CallVantage was a voice over Internet Protocol telephone service first offered in 2004 by AT&T Corp., upon the heels of its announcement that it would stop seeking traditional local and long-distance landline customers.

== Renaming ==
After SBC Communications purchased AT&T Corp. in 2005 and renamed itself AT&T Inc., CallVantage was offered as an option with AT&T Yahoo! DSL service, formerly known as SBC Yahoo! DSL.

== Competition ==
AT&T CallVantage competed with other VoIP providers, such as Vonage. When AT&T U-verse Voice was unveiled January 28, 2008, AT&T continued to market CallVantage to customers without U-verse, particularly customers outside AT&T's local phone service territory. However, AT&T suspended new business later in 2008 "to evaluate CallVantage service."

In a letter dated April 17, 2009, AT&T notified all existing CallVantage subscribers that the service would be discontinued and no longer available later in 2009, which occurred October 20, 2009.
